= Aagaardia longicalcis =

Scientific classification
- Kingdom: Animalia
- Phylum: Arthropoda
- Class: Insecta
- Order: Diptera
- Family: Chironomidae
- Genus: Aagaardia
- Species: A. longicalcis

Binomial name
- Aagaardia longicalcis Sæther, 2000

Species of fly

Aagaardia longicalcis is a species of midge in the family Chironomidae. It was described by Ole Anton Sæther in 2000. It is known from Canada, specifically from New Brunswick and Nova Scotia.

The total length is 1.6–2.2 mm (0.063–0.087 in) and the wing length is 1.1–1.2 mm (0.043–0.047 in).
