= Monodiamesa =

Scientific classification
- Kingdom: Animalia
- Phylum: Arthropoda
- Clade: Pancrustacea
- Class: Insecta
- Order: Diptera
- Family: Chironomidae
- Subfamily: Prodiamesinae
- Genus: Monodiamesa; Kieffer, 1922

Species
- See text

Genus of flies

Monodiamesa is a genus of midges in the non-biting midge family (Chironomidae).

== Species ==
- M. alpicola (Brundin, 1952)
- M. bathyphila (Kieffer, 1918)
- M. bonalpicola Han & Tang, 2021
- M. depectinata Sæther, 1973
- M. ekmani (Brundin, 1949)
- M. prolilobata Sæther, 1973
- M. secunditibetica Han & Tang, 2021
- M. tuberculata Sæther, 1973
