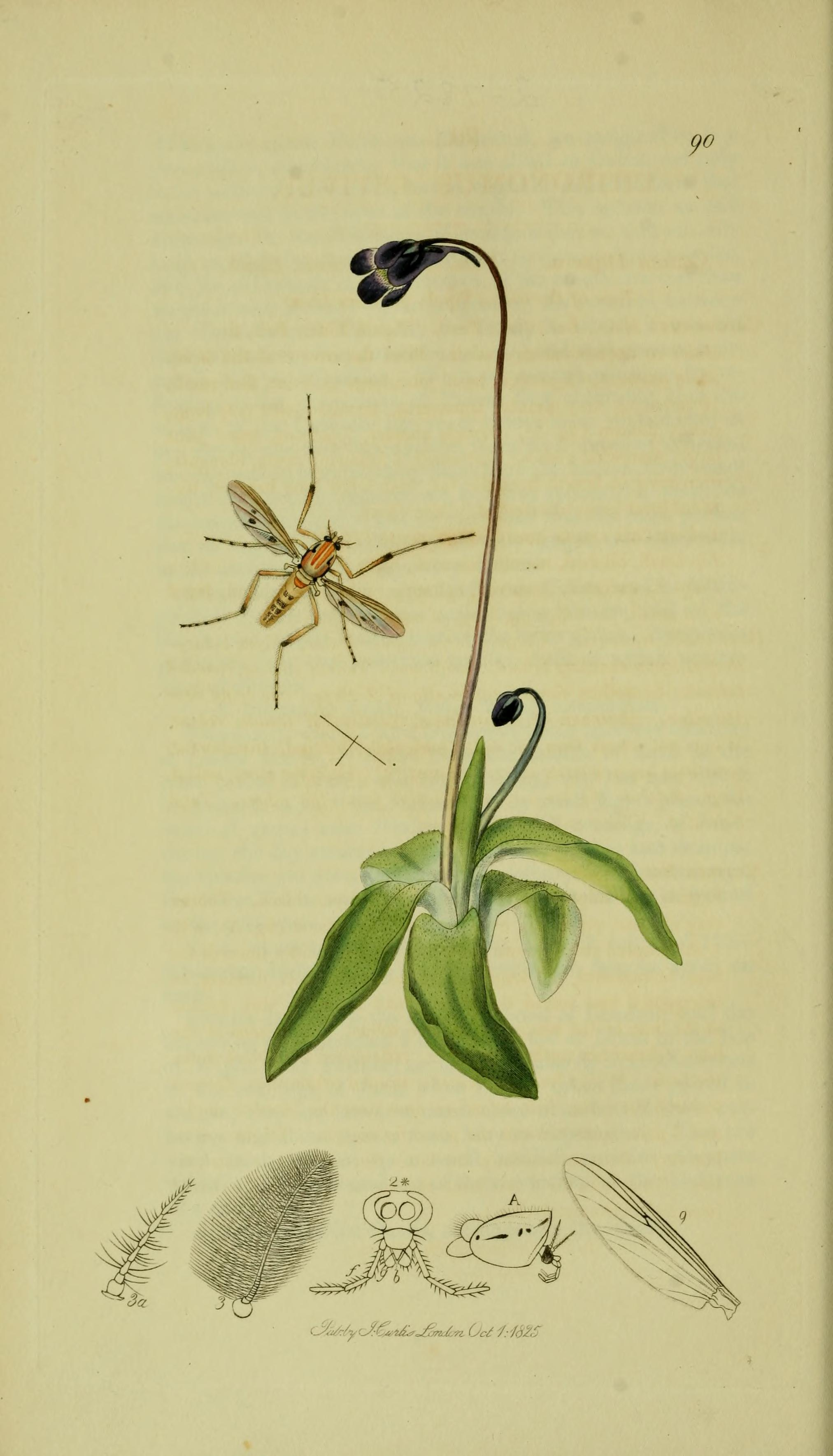
- John Curtis British Entomology (1824-1840) Folio 90 Diptera: Chaeronomus aestivus = Eurycnemus crassipes (Bentleyan Midge). The plant is Pinguicula vulgaris (Common Butterwort).

Scientific classification
- Kingdom: Animalia
- Phylum: Arthropoda
- Class: Insecta
- Order: Diptera
- Family: Chironomidae
- Genus: Eurycnemus
- Species: E. crassipes

Binomial name
- Eurycnemus crassipes (Meigen, 1813)

Synonyms
- Chironomus elegans Meigen, 1818; Eurycnemus elegans (Meigen, 1818)

= Eurycnemus crassipes =

Species of fly

Eurycnemus crassipes is a species of nonbiting midges in the subfamily Orthocladiinae. It is found in Norway.
