= Corynoneura =

Scientific classification
- Kingdom: Animalia
- Phylum: Arthropoda
- Clade: Pancrustacea
- Class: Insecta
- Order: Diptera
- Family: Chironomidae
- Subfamily: Orthocladiinae
- Genus: Corynoneura; Winnertz, 1846

Synonyms
- Eucorynoneura Goetghebuer, 1939; Paracorynoneura Goetghebuer, 1939

Genus of flies

Corynoneura is a speciose genus of non-biting midges in the subfamily Orthocladiinae of the bloodworm family Chironomidae. With a world-wide distribution (absent from Antarctica), these small midges are found in both flowing and standing freshwater of various thermal regimes.

== Species ==
- C. arctica Kieffer, 1923
- C. brundini Hirvenoja & Hirvenoja, 1988
- C. carriana Edwards, 1924
- C. celeripes Winnertz, 1852
- C. celtica Edwards, 1924
- C. coronata Edwards, 1924
- C. diara Roback, 1957
- C. edwardsi Brundin, 1949
- C. fittkaui Schlee, 1968
- C. fortispicula Weidenburg & Trivinho-Strixino, 2011
- C. gratias Schlee, 1968
- C. gynocera Tuiskunen, 1983
- C. hermanni Weidenburg & Trivinho-Strixino, 2011
- C. lacustris Edwards, 1924
- C. lobata Edwards, 1924
- C. longipennis Tokunaga, 1936
- C. magna Brundin, 1949
- C. marina Kieffer, 1924
- C. mediaspicula Weidenburg & Trivinho-Strixino, 2011
- C. mineira Weidenburg & Trivinho-Strixino, 2011
- C. oxfordana Boesel and Winner, 1980
- C. scutellata Winnertz, 1846
- C. septadentata Weidenburg & Trivinho-Strixino, 2011
- C. sertaodaquina Weidenburg & Trivinho-Strixino, 2011
- C. taris Roback, 1957
- C. unicapsulata Weidenburg & Trivinho-Strixino, 2011
