= Oliveridia =

Scientific classification
- Domain: Eukaryota
- Kingdom: Animalia
- Phylum: Arthropoda
- Class: Insecta
- Order: Diptera
- Family: Chironomidae
- Subfamily: Orthocladiinae
- Genus: Oliveridia; Sæther, 1980

Genus of flies

Oliveridia is a genus of midges and consists of two species: O. hugginsi and O. tricornis.

Oliveridia hugginsi Ferrington and Sæther is known from the Big Caney River in Kansas. It commonly emerges in January. This is the southernmost record of a species of the genus Oliveridia.
