= Apometriocnemus =

Scientific classification
- Kingdom: Animalia
- Phylum: Arthropoda
- Class: Insecta
- Order: Diptera
- Family: Chironomidae
- Subfamily: Orthocladiinae
- Genus: Apometriocnemus; Sæther, 1984

Type species
- Apometriocnemus fontinalis Sæther, 1984

Genus of flies

Apometriocnemus is a genus of non-biting midges in the subfamily Orthocladiinae of the bloodworm family Chironomidae.

== Species ==
- Apometriocnemus fontinalis Sæther, 1984
- Apometriocnemus japonicus Kobayashi & Suzuki, 1999

Apometriocnemus beringensis Cranston & Oliver, 1988 was transferred to Metriocnemus by Sæther in 1995.
