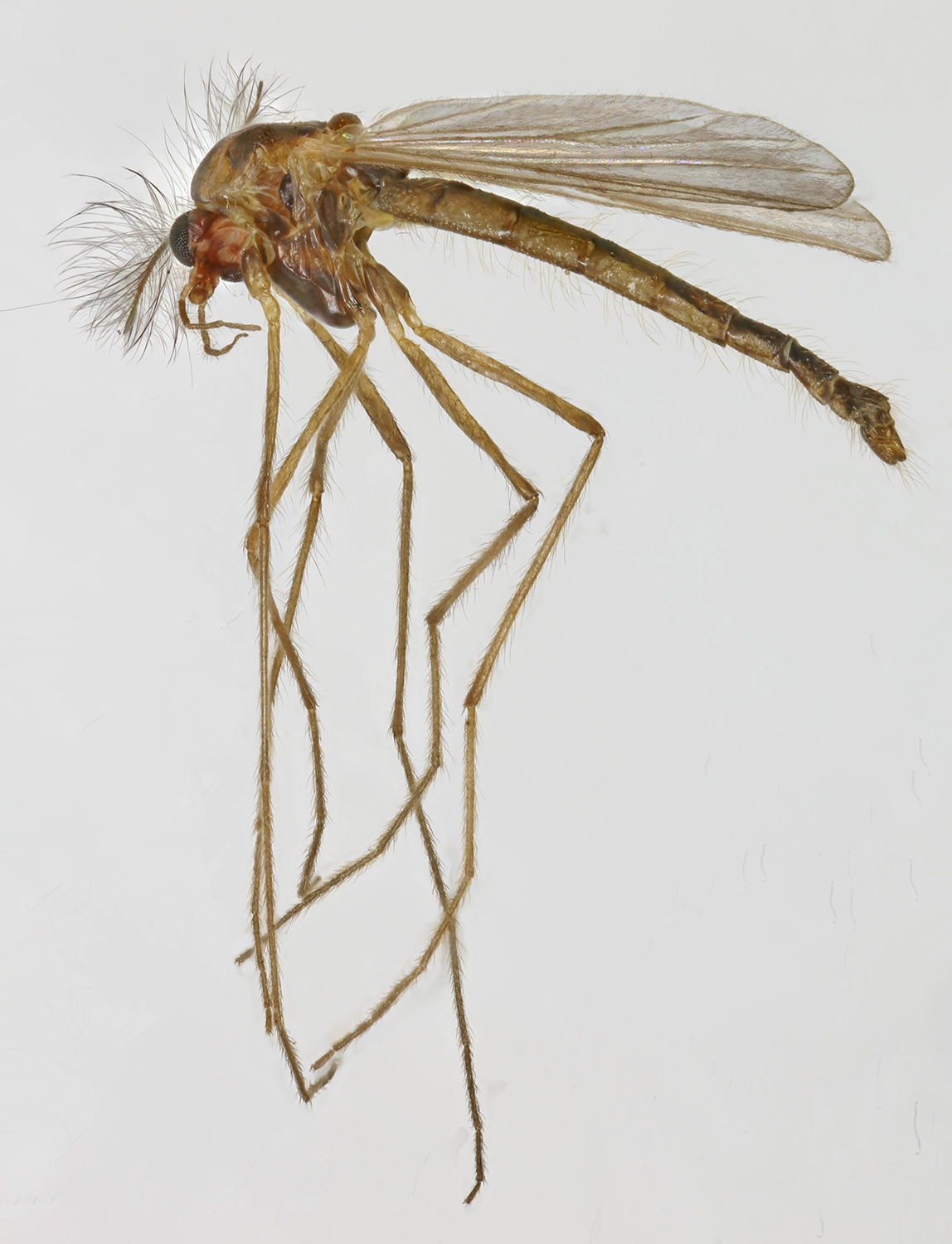
- Brillia bifida

Scientific classification
- Kingdom: Animalia
- Phylum: Arthropoda
- Clade: Pancrustacea
- Class: Insecta
- Order: Diptera
- Family: Chironomidae
- Subfamily: Orthocladiinae; Lenz, 1921

Genera
- Numerous, see text

= Orthocladiinae =

Subfamily of flies

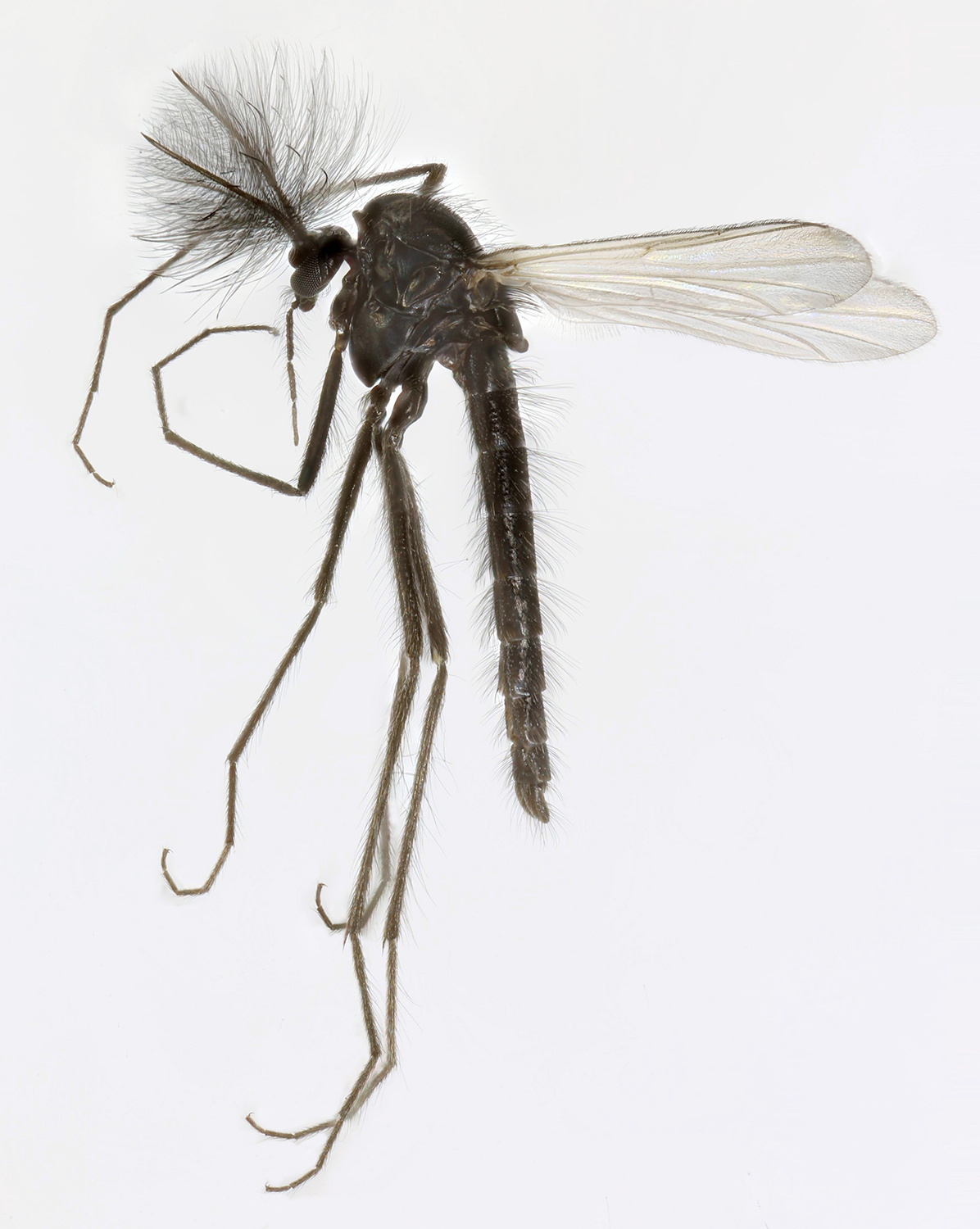
Metriocnemus picipes.

Cricotopus sp., male on grass.

Orthocladiinae is a subfamily of midges in the non-biting midge family (Chironomidae). For lack of a better common name, they are simply referred to as orthoclads.

== Genera ==
- Aagaardia Sæther, 1985
- Abiskomyia Edwards, 1937
- Acamptocladius Brundin, 1956
- Acricotopus Kieffer, 1921
- Antillocladius Sæther, 1981
- Apometriocnemus Sæther, 1984
- Austrobrillia Freeman, 1961
- Baeoctenus Sæther, 1976
- Belgica Jacobs, 1900
- Boreosmittia Tuiskunen, 1986
- Brillia Kieffer, 1913
- Bryophaenocladius Thienemann, 1934
- Camptocladius van der Wulp, 1874
- Cardiocladius Kieffer, 1912
- Chaetocladius Kieffer, 1911
- Chasmatonotus
- Clunio Haliday, 1855
- Compterosmittia
- Corynoneura Winnertz, 1846
- Corynoneurella Brundin, 1949
- Cricotopus van der Wulp, 1874
- Diplocladius Kieffer, 1908
- Diplosmittia
- Doithrix
- Doncricotopus
- Epoicocladius Sulc & ZavÍel, 1924
- Eretmoptera
- Eukiefferiella Thienemann, 1926
- Eurycnemus van der Wulp, 1874
- Euryhapsis Oliver, 1981
- Georthocladius Strenzke, 1941
- Gravatamberus
- Gymnometriocnemus Goetghebeur, 1932
- Gynocladius Mendes, Sæther & Andrade-Morraye, 2005
- Halocladius Hirvenoja, 1973
- Hanocladius
- Heleniella Gouin, 1943
- Heterotanytarsus Spärck, 1923
- Heterotrissocladius Spärck, 1923
- Hydrobaenus
- Ichthyocladius Fittkau, 1974
- Irisobrillia
- Krenosmittia Thienemann & Krüger, 1939
- Labrundinia Fittkau, 1962
- Lerheimia Andersen & Sæther, 1993
- Limnophyes Eaton, 1875
- Lipurometriocnemus
- Litocladius Andersen, Mendes & Sæther, 2004
- Lopescladius
- Lyrocladius Mendes & Andersen, 2008
- Mesocricotopus
- Mesosmittia Brundin, 1956
- Metriocnemus van der Wulp, 1874
- Nanocladius Kieffer, 1913
- Oliveridia Sæther, 1980
- Onconeura
- Oreadomyia
- Orthocladius van der Wulp, 1874
- Parachaetocladius
- Paracladius Hirvenoja, 1973
- Paracricotopus Thienemann & Harnisch, 1932
- Parakiefferiella Thienemann, 1936
- Paralauterborniella
- Paralimnophyes Brundin, 1956
- Parametriocnemus Goetghebuer, 1932
- Paraphaenocladius Thienemann, 1924
- Parasmittia
- Paratrichocladius Thienemann, 1942
- Paratrissocladius ZavÍel, 1937
- Parorthocladius Thienemann, 1935
- Platysmittia Sæther, 1982
- Plhudsonia
- Psectrocladius Kieffer, 1906
- Pseudokiefferiella Zavrel, 1941
- Pseudorthocladius Goetghebuer, 1932
- Pseudosmittia Goetghebuer, 1932
- Psilometriocnemus Sæther, 1969
- Qiniella Wang & Sæther, 1998
- Rheocricotopus Brundin, 1956
- Rheosmittia Brundin, 1956
- Saetheriella Halvorsen, 1982
- Semiocladius
- Smittia Holmgren, 1869
- Stackelbergina
- Stilocladius Rossaro, 1979
- Symbiocladius
- Synorthocladius Thienemann, 1935
- Thalassosmittia Strenzke & Remmert, 1957
- Thienemannia Kieffer, 1909
- Thienemanniella Kieffer, 1911
- Titimbera Andersen, Pinho & Mendes, 2015
- Tokunagaia Sæther, 1973
- Trissocladius Kieffer, 1908
- Tvetenia Kieffer, 1922
- Unniella Sæther, 1982
- Vivacricotopus
- Xylotopus
- Zalutschia Lipina, 1939
