= Parachaetocladius akanoctavus =

Scientific classification
- Kingdom: Animalia
- Phylum: Arthropoda
- Class: Insecta
- Order: Diptera
- Family: Chironomidae
- Genus: Parachaetocladius
- Species: P. akanoctavus

Binomial name
- Parachaetocladius akanoctavus Sasa & Kamimura, 1987

Synonyms
- Limnophyes kuramasingularis Parachaetocladius kamiovatus Limnophyes kamiovatus Parachaetocladius sunabaabeus Psectrocladius (Monopsectrocladius) sunabaabeus

Species of fly

Parachaetocladius akanoctavus is a species of non-biting midge in the subfamily Orthocladiinae of the bloodworm family (Chironomidae). It was first described in 1987 by the Japanese entomologists Manabu Sasa and Yoshitaka Kamimura. A later description of the species was given in 2020 by Namayandeh et al and further redescription of the adult male together with a first description of the pupa and fourth instar larva in 2021 by Russian entomologists, Makarchenko and Yavorskaya.

It is found in Japan, and possibly on the Korean Peninsula, and in the Russian Far East.
