= Antillocladius =

Scientific classification
- Kingdom: Animalia
- Phylum: Arthropoda
- Clade: Pancrustacea
- Class: Insecta
- Order: Diptera
- Family: Chironomidae
- Subfamily: Orthocladiinae
- Genus: Antillocladius; Sæther, 1981

Genus of flies

Antillocladius is a genus of midges belonging to the family Chironomidae, subfamily Orthocladiinae. The name Antillocladius means orthoclad (subfamily Orthocladiinae) that occurs in the Antilles, where it was primarily recorded.

== Distribution ==
The genus Antillocladius is distributed in the Nearctic, Neotropical, Palaearctic (East Asia) and Indomalayan realms. The genus was erected by Sæther (1981) based on A. antecalvus Sæther, 1981, from the British West Indies: Saint Vincent and Saint Lucia. Subsequently, Sæther (1982) described two new species from the southeastern United States (Antillocladius arcuatus and Antillocladius pluspilalus) and emended the genus. Wang and Sæther (1993) described two additional new species from Palaearctic and Oriental China. Andersen and Contreras-Ramos (1999) described the first species from Continental South America (Ecuador). The genus was revised by Mendes, Andersen & Sæther (2004), with the addition of nine species, plus two Japanese species transferred to the genus (Yamamoto, 2004). Recently the genus was revised by Mendes & Andersen (2008) with the addition of 7 new species from Brazil and a new combination of a species from India. The genus thus comprises:

== Species ==
- A. anandae Mendes, Andersen & Hagenlund, 2011 - recorded from Brazil
- A. antecalvus Sæther, 1981 - recorded from Saint Vincent, Brazil and Venezuela
- A. arcuatus Sæther, 1982 - recorded from United States, Brazil, Mexico and Venezuela
- A. atalaia Mendes & Andersen, 2008 - recorded from Brazil
- A. axitiosus Mendes & Andersen, 2008 - recorded from Brazil
- A. biota Mendes, Andersen & Sæther, 2004 - recorded from Brazil
- A. brazuca Mendes & Andersen, 2008 - recorded from Brazil
- A. calakmulensis Mendes, Andersen & Sæther, 2004 - recorded from Mexico
- A. campususp Mendes & Andersen, 2008 - recorded from Brazil
- A. folius Mendes, Andersen & Sæther, 2004 - recorded from Brazil
- A. gephyrus Mendes & Andersen, 2008 - recorded from Brazil
- A. herradurus Mendes, Andersen & Sæther, 2004 - recorded from Mexico
- A. itatiaia Mendes, Andersen & Hagenlund, 2011 - recorded from Brazil
- A. laviejae Ospina-Torres, Jaime-Murcia & Mey, 2018 - recorded from Colombia
- A. musci Mendes, Andersen & Sæther, 2004 - recorded from Brazil
- A. plicatus Mendes & Andersen, 2008 - recorded from Brazil
- A. pluspilalus Sæther, 1982 - recorded from United States, Ecuador, Mexico and Nicaragua
- A. scalpellatus Wang & Sæther, 1993 - recorded from China and Russia
- A. skartveiti Andersen & Contreras-Ramos, 1999 - recorded from Ecuador
- A. sooretama Mendes, Andersen & Sæther, 2004 - recorded from Brazil
- A. subnubilus (Sinharay & Chaudhuri, 1979) - recorded from India
- A. tokarameneus (Sasa & Suzuki, 1995) - recorded from Japan
- A. ubatuba Mendes, Andersen & Sæther, 2004 - recorded from Brazil
- A. ultimus Mendes & Andersen, 2008 - recorded from Brazil
- A. venequatoriensis Mendes, Andersen & Sæther, 2004 - recorded from Venezuela and Ecuador
- A. yakyijeus (Sasa & Suzuki, 2000) - recorded from Japan
- A. zempoalensis Mendes, Andersen & Sæther, 2004 - recorded from Mexico
- A. zhengi Wang & Sæther, 1993 - recorded from China and Thailand

== Characteristics ==
The species are based on male genitalia characters and only two females are described, A. musci and A. antecalvus. The pupae are known of only four species, A. antecalvus, A. folius, A. musci and A. pluspilalus. The larvae are known of only three species, A. folius, A. musci and A. pluspilalus.

The immatures of the genus are described from terrestrial and semi-terrestrial habitats, sharing the environment with many other genera in the subfamily Orthocladiinae.

== Bibliography ==
- Andersen, T. & Contreras-Ramos, A. (1999) First record of Antillocladius Sæther from Continental South America (Chironomidae, Orthocladiinae). Acta Zoologica Academiae Scientiarum Hungaricae 45, 149–154.
- Coffman, W.P., Cranston, P.S., Oliver, D.R. & Sæther, O.A. (1986) The pupae of Orthocladiinae (Diptera: Chironomidae) of the Holarctic region. Keys and diagnoses. In: Wiederholm, T. (Ed.) Chironomidae of the Holarctic region. Keys and diagnoses. Part 2. Pupae. Entomologica scandinavica, Supplement, 28, 147–298.
- Cranston, P.S., Oliver, D.R. & Sæther, O.A. (1983) The larvae of Orthocladiinae (Diptera: Chironomidae) of the Holarctic region. Keys and diagnoses. In: Wiederholm, T. (Ed.) Chironomidae of the Holarctic region. Keys and diagnoses. Part 1. Larvae. Entomologica scandinavica, Supplement 19, 149–291.
- Cranston, P.S., Oliver, D.R. & Sæther, O.A. (1989) The adult males of Orthocladiinae (Diptera: Chironomidae) of the Holarctic region - Keys and diagnoses. In: Wiederholm, T. (Ed.), Chironomidae of the Holarctic region - Keys and diagnoses. Part 3. Adult males. Entomologica scandinavica, Supplement 34, 165–352.
- Mendes, H.F. & Andersen, T. (2008) A review of Antillocladius Sæther, 1981 and Litocladius Mendes, Andersen et Sæther, with the description of two new Neotropical genera (Diptera, Chironomidae, Orthocladiinae). Zootaxa 1887, 1–75.
- Mendes, H.F., Andersen, T. & Hagenlund, L.K. (2011). New species and records of Antillocladius Sæther and Litocladius Mendes, Andersen et Sæther from Brazil and Costa Rica (Chironomidae: Orthocladiinae). Zootaxa 2915, 39-51.
- Mendes, H.F., Andersen, T. & Sæther, O.A. (2004) A review of Antillocladius Sæther, 1981; Compterosmittia Sæther, 1981 and Litocladius new genus (Chironomidae, Orthocladiinae). Zootaxa 594, 1–82.
- Sasa, M. & Suzuki, H. (1995) The chironomid species collected on the Tokara Islands, Kagoshima (Diptera). Japanese Journal of Sanitary Zoology, 46, 255-288.
- Sasa, M. & Suzuki, H. (2000) Studies on the Chironomid Midges Collected on Yakushima Island, Southwestern Japan. Tropical Medicine 42, 53-134.
- Sæther, O.A. (1981) Orthocladiinae (Chironomidae: Diptera) from the British West Indies with descriptions of Antillocladius n. gen., Lipurometriocmemus n. gen., Compterosmittia n. gen. and Diplosmittia n. gen. – Entomologica scandinavica, Supplement,16, 1-46.
- Sæther, O.A. (1982) Orthocladiinae (Diptera: Chironomidae) from SE U.S.A., with descriptions of Plhudsonia, Unniella and Platysmittia n. genera and Atelopodella n. subgen. Entomologica scandinavica 13, 465–510.
- Sæther, O.A. (1984) The immatures of Antillocladius Sæther, 1981 (Diptera: Chironomidae). Aquatic Insects 6, 1–6.
- Spies, M. & Reiss, F. (1996) Catalog and bibliography of Neotropical and Mexican Chironomidae (Insecta, Diptera). Spixiana, Supplement 22, 61–119.
- Tiunova, T.M., Teslenko, V.A., Arefina, T.I., Makarchenko, M.A. & Zorina, O.V. (2003) Fauna of aquatic insects in Barabashevka River basin (Southern Primorye). In: Vladimir Ya. Levanidov's Biennial Memorial Meetings, vol 2. Dalnauka, Vladivostok, pp. 61–69. [in Russian].
- Wang, X. (2000) A revised checklist of chironomids from China (Diptera). In: Hoffrichter, O. (Ed.) Late 20th Century Research on Chironomide: An Anthology from the 13th International Symposium on Chironomidae. Freiburg, 5–9 September 1997. Aachen, Shaker Verlag, 629–652.
- Wang, X. & Sæther, O.A. (1993) First Palaearctic and Oriental records of the orthoclad genus Antillocladius Sæther (Diptera: Chironomidae). Entomologica scandinavica 24, 227–230.
- Yamamoto, M. (2004) A catalog of Japanese Orthocladiinae (Diptera: Chironomidae). Makunagi/ Acta Dipterologica 21, 1-121.
