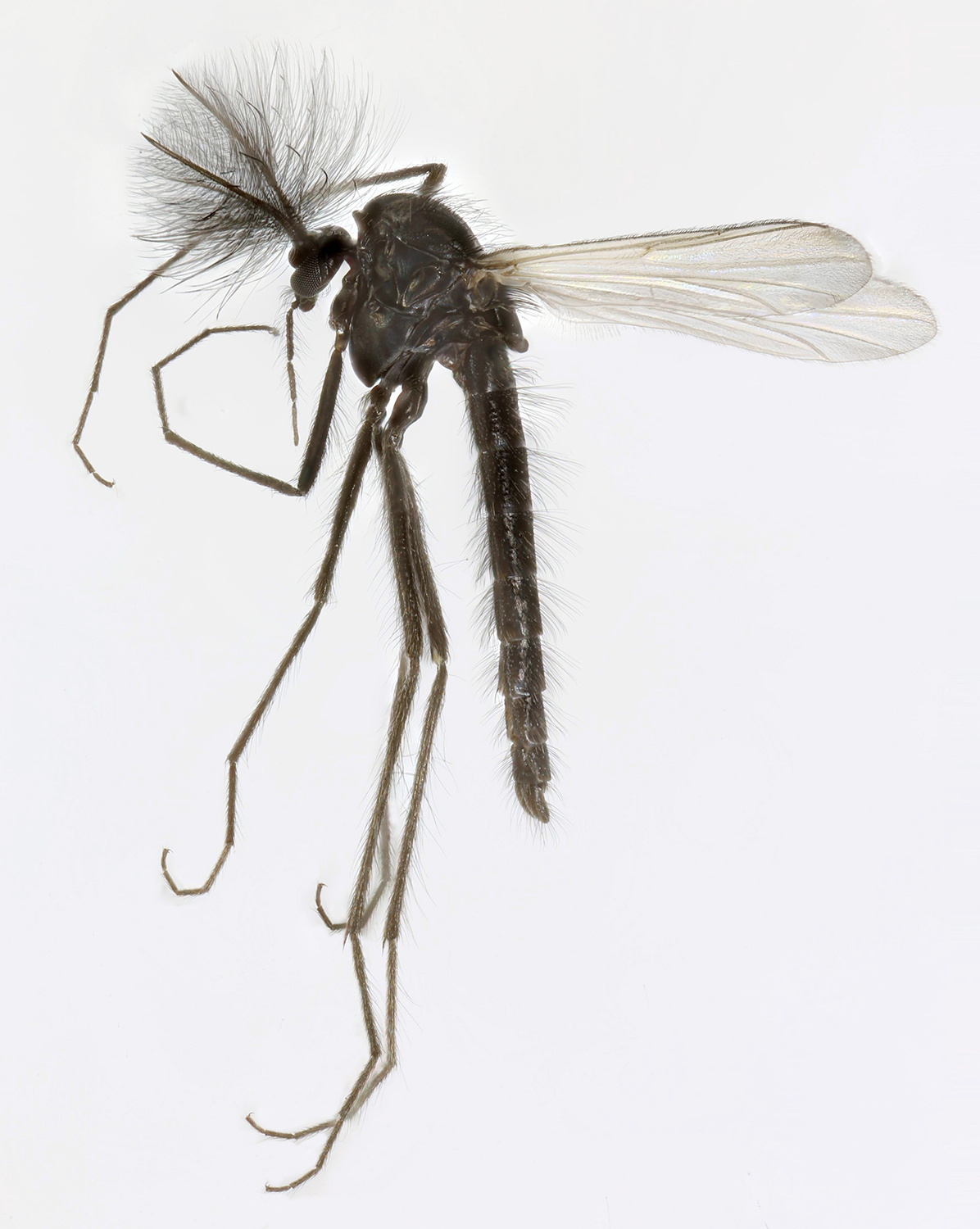
- Metriocnemus picipes

Scientific classification
- Kingdom: Animalia
- Phylum: Arthropoda
- Clade: Pancrustacea
- Class: Insecta
- Order: Diptera
- Family: Chironomidae
- Subfamily: Orthocladiinae
- Genus: Metriocnemus van der Wulp, 1874

Type species
- Chironomus albolineatus Meigen, 1818

Synonyms
- Arctomyia Lundström, 1915; Chasmatocladius Kieffer, 1919; Crymaleomyia Ashe & O'Connor, 2000; Dolichoprymna Lundström, 1915; Inermipupa Langton & Cobo, 1997; Wulpiella Kieffer, 1899

= Metriocnemus =

Genus of flies

Metriocnemus is a genus of non-biting midges in the subfamily Orthocladiinae of the bloodworm family Chironomidae.

== Species ==
- M. acutus Sæther, 1995
- M. aequalis Johannsen, 1934
- M. albolineatus (Meigen, 1818)
- M. atratulus (Zetterstedt, 1850)
- M. atriclava Kieffer, 1921
- M. beringiensis (Cranston & Oliver, 1988)
- M. brusti Sæther, 1989
- M. calvescens Sæther, 1995
- M. carmencitabertarum Langton & Cobo, 1997
- M. caudigus Sæther, 1995
- M. cavicola Kieffer, 1921
- M. corticalis Strenzke, 1950
- M. dentipalpus Sæther, 1995
- M. edwardsi Jones, 1916
- M. eryngiotelmatus, Donato & Paggi, 2005
- M. eurynotus (Holmgren, 1883)
- M. exilacies Sæther, 1995
- M. fuscipes (Meigen, 1818)
- M. herbicolus Hardy, 1960
- M. hirticollis (Stæger, 1839)
- M. hornsbyensis Freeman, 1961
- M. hygropetricus (Kieffer, 1911)
- M. inopinatus Strenzke, 1950
- M. intergerivus Sæther, 1995
- M. knabi Coquillett, 1904
- M. lacteolus Goetghebuer, 1921
- M. longipennis (Holmgren, 1883)
- M. obscuripes (Holmgren, 1869)
- M. pankratovae Golubeva, 1980
- M. perfuscus Malloch, 1934
- M. picipes (Meigen, 1818)
- M. polaris Kieffer, 1926
- M. similis Kieffer, 1922
- M. terrester Pagast, 1941
- M. tristellus Edwards, 1929
- M. ursinus (Holmgren, 1869)
- M. wangi Sæther, 1995
