= Nanocladius =

Scientific classification
- Kingdom: Animalia
- Phylum: Arthropoda
- Class: Insecta
- Order: Diptera
- Family: Chironomidae
- Subfamily: Orthocladiinae
- Genus: Nanocladius; Kieffer, 1913

Subgenera
- Nanocladius s. str.; Plecopteracoluthus Steffan, 1965

Genus of flies

Nanocladius is a genus of non-biting midges of the bloodworm family Chironomidae. Larvae either live commensally on or as parasites of aquatic insects in nymphal stages; hosts include mayflies, stoneflies, dobsonflies, or damselflies. The larvae attach to their hosts by forming silken tubes which they later pupate in. They feed on the hemolymph of their host.

== Subgenera ==
Nanocladius has two subgenera, Nanocladius s. str., and Plecopteracoluthus, erected in 1965. In 1977, Ole A. Sæther suggested the latter be considered a subgenus of Nanocladius.
