= Qiniella =

Scientific classification
- Kingdom: Animalia
- Phylum: Arthropoda
- Clade: Pancrustacea
- Class: Insecta
- Order: Diptera
- Family: Chironomidae
- Subfamily: Orthocladiinae
- Genus: Qiniella; Wang & Sæther, 1998

Genus of flies

Qiniella is a genus of non-biting midges in the diptera subfamily Orthocladiinae of the family Chironomidae.

The genus Qiniella was first described by Xinhua Wang & Ole A. Sæther in 1998 for a single species, Q. lii, recorded from China. Posteriorly, Mendes and Andersen described two additional species, Q. copa and Q. thai, from Malaysia and Thailand respectively.

Only the male adults are known, but Q. copa was collected high in the tree canopies in Malaysia, suggesting that this genus has terrestrial-immature forms.
