= Ichthyocladius =

Scientific classification
- Domain: Eukaryota
- Kingdom: Animalia
- Phylum: Arthropoda
- Class: Insecta
- Order: Diptera
- Family: Chironomidae
- Subfamily: Orthocladiinae
- Genus: Ichthyocladius; Fittkau, 1974

Genus of flies

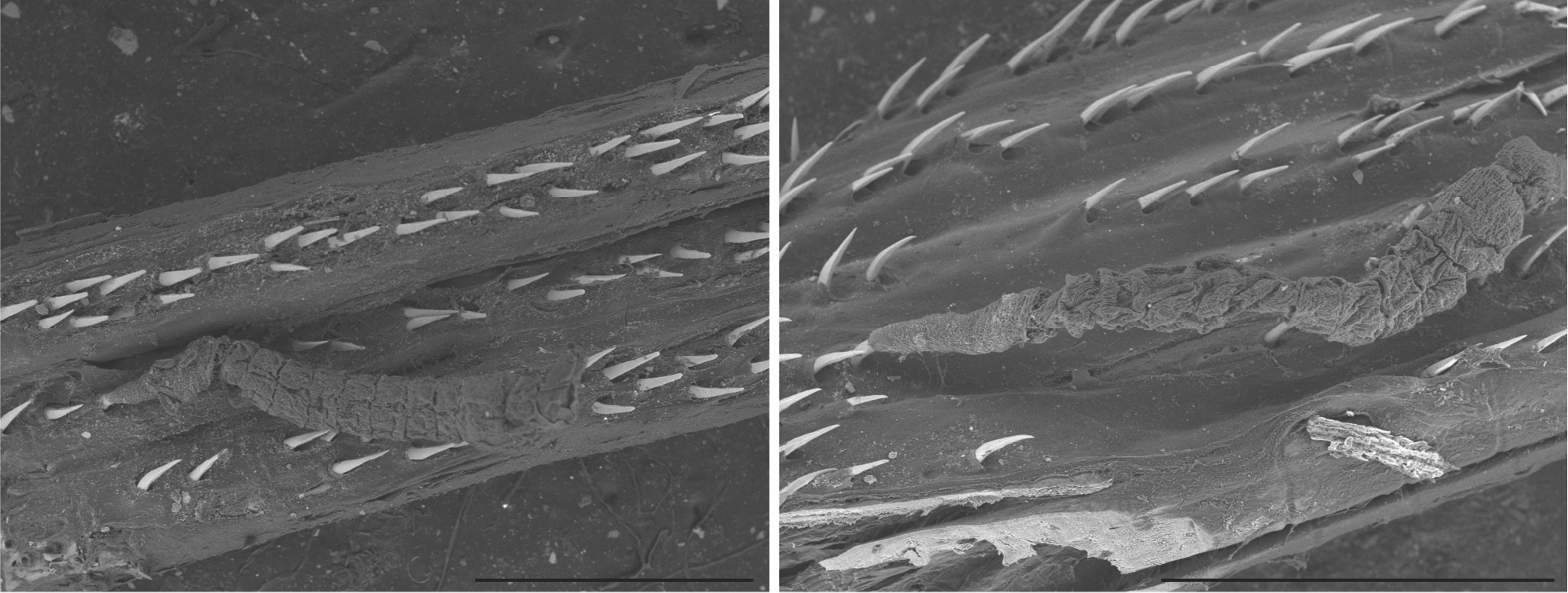

Ichthyocladius is a genus of chironomid midges that belongs to the subfamily Orthocladiinae described by Fittkau based on one species, Ichthyocladius neotropicus, from Peru, though some other species were recognised, the lack of knowledge did not allow their description. Two additional species from Brazil were described by Mendes, Andersen & Sæther (Ichthyocladius lilianae and Ichthyocladius kronichthicola).

The larvae live on fish, generally attached to their fins, of three different catfish families, Astroblepidae, Loricariidae and Trichomycteridae. The diet of the larvae is yet controversial, some say they feed on fish mucus while some say they are feeding on other things and use the fish only for locomotion.
