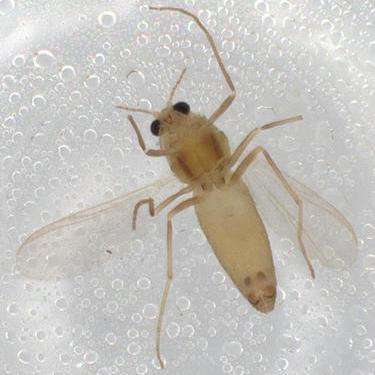

Scientific classification
- Kingdom: Animalia
- Phylum: Arthropoda
- Class: Insecta
- Order: Diptera
- Family: Chironomidae
- Subfamily: Orthocladiinae
- Genus: Smittia; Holmgren, 1869

Synonyms
- Orthosmittia Goetghebuer, 1943

= Smittia =

Genus of flies

Smittia is a genus of European non-biting midges in the subfamily Orthocladiinae of the bloodworm family (Chironomidae).

== Species ==
- S. albipennis (Goetghebuer, 1921)
- S. amoena Caspers, 1985
- S. aterrima (Meigen, 1818)
- S. brevifurcata (Edwards, 1926)
- S. contingens (Walker, 1856)
- S. edwardsi Goetghebuer, 1932
- S. extrema (Holmgren, 1869)
- S. foliacea (Kieffer, 1921)
- S. hakusansecunda Sasa & Okazawa, 1994
- S. leucopogon (Meigen, 1804)
- S. nudipennis (Goetghebuer, 1913)
- S. pratorum (Goetghebuer, 1927)
- S. superata Goetghebuer, 1939
