= Litocladius =

Scientific classification
- Domain: Eukaryota
- Kingdom: Animalia
- Phylum: Arthropoda
- Class: Insecta
- Order: Diptera
- Family: Chironomidae
- Subfamily: Orthocladiinae
- Genus: Litocladius; Andersen, Mendes & Sæther 2004

Genus of flies

Litocladius is a genus of chironomid midges that belongs to the subfamily Orthocladiinae and is composed of three species, Litocladius confusus Mendes et Andersen (2008), Litocladius mateusi Mendes, Andersen & Sæther (2004), and Litocladius floripa Mendes et Andersen (2008) all described from Brazil only. Male, female, and pupa of the type species (Litocladius mateusi) are described, the remaining two species are known only from the male adults. This species are known from the Atlantic Forest, along the Brazilian coastline.

The types/biological type of the only known species are housed in São Paulo, Brazil and Bergen, Norway.

The etymology of the genus is from the Greek "litos", meaning plain, simple, referring to the reduced pupa and the shape of the inferior volsella; "cladius" stands as a common ending among Orthocladiinae.

The only pupa recorded was found living among mosses on tree trunks; no data on the larvae are available so far.
