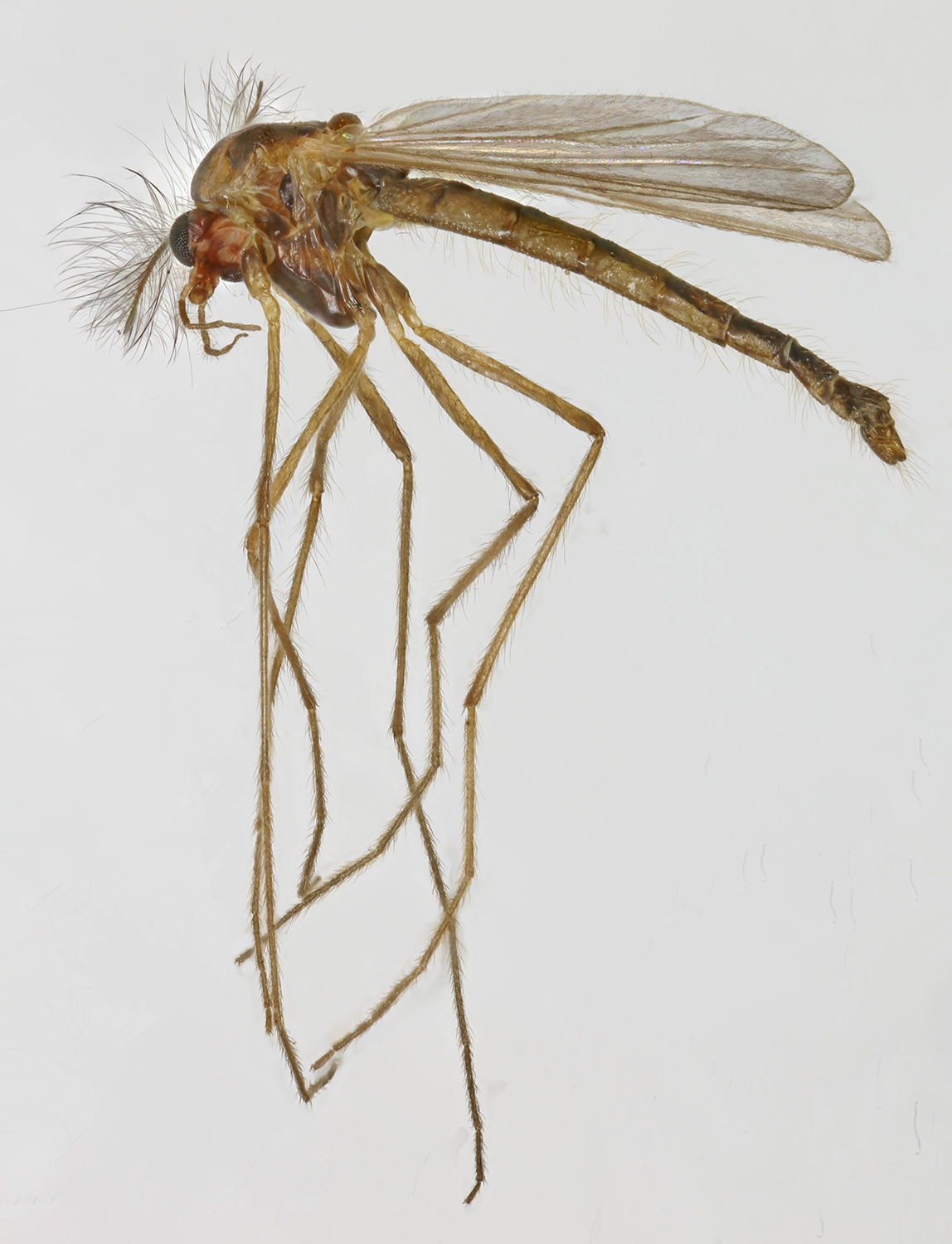
- Brillia bifida

Scientific classification
- Domain: Eukaryota
- Kingdom: Animalia
- Phylum: Arthropoda
- Class: Insecta
- Order: Diptera
- Family: Chironomidae
- Subfamily: Orthocladiinae
- Genus: Brillia; Kieffer, 1913

= Brillia =

Genus of flies

Brillia is a genus of non-biting midges in the subfamily Orthocladiinae of the family (Chironomidae).

== Species ==
- B. bifida (Kieffer 1909)
- B. flavifrons (Johannsen 1905)
- B. flavifrons (Johannsen, 1905)
- B. japónica Tokunaga, 1939
- B. kultia
- B. laculata Oliver and Roussel, 1983
- B. longifurca Kieffer 1921
- B. modesta (Meigen, 1830)
- B. parva Joahnnsen, 1934
- B. pudorosa Cobo, Gonzales & Vieira-Lanero 1995
- B. retifinis Sæther, 1969
- B. sera Roback, 1957
