= Platysmittia =

Scientific classification
- Kingdom: Animalia
- Phylum: Arthropoda
- Clade: Pancrustacea
- Class: Insecta
- Order: Diptera
- Family: Chironomidae
- Subfamily: Orthocladiinae
- Genus: Platysmittia; Saether, 1982

Type species
- P. fimbriata Saether, 1982

Species
- See text

Genus of flies

Platysmittia is a genus of midges in the non-biting midge family (Chironomidae).

Only two species are known. P. fimbriata is recorded from Tennessee and North Carolina. P. bilyji is known from Pennsylvania and Maryland,

Larvae of the two species can be told apart by the longer 4th antennal segment in P. bilyji.

== Species ==
- P. bilyji Saether, 1985
- P. fimbriata Saether, 1982
