= Psectrocladius =

Scientific classification
- Kingdom: Animalia
- Phylum: Arthropoda
- Class: Insecta
- Order: Diptera
- Family: Chironomidae
- Subfamily: Orthocladiinae
- Genus: Psectrocladius; Kieffer, 1906

Genus of flies

Psectrocladius is a genus of non-biting midges of the bloodworm family Chironomidae.
