= Gynocladius =

Scientific classification
- Domain: Eukaryota
- Kingdom: Animalia
- Phylum: Arthropoda
- Class: Insecta
- Order: Diptera
- Family: Chironomidae
- Subfamily: Orthocladiinae
- Genus: Gynocladius; Mendes, Sæther & Andrade-Morraye, 2005

Genus of flies

Gynocladius is a parthenogenetic genus in the subfamily Orthocladiinae (Chironomidae). A single species is recorded from Southeast Brazil, Gynocladius scalpellosus, described by Mendes, Sæther and Andrade-Morraye in 2005. The name stands for the presence of only females (gyneo, gyneco; woman, female in Greek).

All life stages are known, but the sole record of this species is the type material. The holotype is housed in the Museu de Zoologia da Universidade de São Paulo (MZUSP), São Paulo, Brazil, paratypes are housed in São Paulo and Bergen, Norway
