= Aagaardia =

Scientific classification
- Domain: Eukaryota
- Kingdom: Animalia
- Phylum: Arthropoda
- Class: Insecta
- Order: Diptera
- Family: Chironomidae
- Subfamily: Orthocladiinae
- Genus: Aagaardia; Sæther, 2000

Species
- See text.

Genus of flies

Aagaardia is a genus of fly in the Chironomidae family. Aagaardia have been found in Northern Europe, Turkey, Russian Far East, and Canada.

Aagaardia are small flies with the adults measuring less than 2.5 mm (0.098 in) and larvae less than 4 mm (0.16 in).

== Species ==
There are five recognized species within the genus:

- Aagaardia longicalcis Sæther, 2000
- Aagaardia oksanae Makarchenko & Makarchenko, 2005
- Aagaardia protensa Sæther, 2000
- Aagaardia sivertseni (Aagaard, 1979)
- Aagaardia triangulata Sæther, 2000
