= Xylotopus par =

Scientific classification
- Kingdom: Animalia
- Phylum: Arthropoda
- Clade: Pancrustacea
- Class: Insecta
- Order: Diptera
- Family: Chironomidae
- Genus: Xylotopus
- Species: X. par

Binomial name
- Xylotopus par (Coquiletti, 1901)

Synonyms
- Eurycnemus scitulus Coquillett, 1901; Metriocnemus par Johannsen, 1905; Orthocladius par Coquillett, 1901

Species of fly

Xylotopus par is a species of midge in the family Chironomidae.
