= Usambaromyia =

Scientific classification
- Kingdom: Animalia
- Phylum: Arthropoda
- Clade: Pancrustacea
- Class: Insecta
- Order: Diptera
- Family: Chironomidae
- Subfamily: Usambaromyiinae; Andersen & Sæther, 1994
- Genus: Usambaromyia; Andersen & Sæther, 1994
- Species: U. nigrala

Binomial name
- Usambaromyia nigrala Andersen & Sæther, 1994

Species of fly

Usambaromyia nigrala is a species of African non-biting midges, and is the only species in the subfamily Usambaromyiinae.
