= Epoicocladius =

Scientific classification
- Kingdom: Animalia
- Phylum: Arthropoda
- Clade: Pancrustacea
- Class: Insecta
- Order: Diptera
- Family: Chironomidae
- Subfamily: Orthocladiinae
- Genus: Epoicocladius; Sulc & ZavÍel, 1924

Genus of flies

Epoicocladius is a genus of non-biting midges in the subfamily Orthocladiinae of the bloodworm family Chironomidae.

== Species ==
- E. ephemerae (Kieffer in Sulc & ZavÍel, 1924)
- E. wangi Liu et Yan 2019
