= Lyrocladius =

Scientific classification
- Domain: Eukaryota
- Kingdom: Animalia
- Phylum: Arthropoda
- Class: Insecta
- Order: Diptera
- Family: Chironomidae
- Subfamily: Orthocladiinae
- Genus: Lyrocladius; Mendes & Andersen, 2008

Genus of flies

Lyrocladius is a genus of chironomid midges that belongs to the subfamily Orthocladiinae and is composed of a single species, Lyrocladius radulatus Mendes et Andersen (2008), described from Brazil. The genus is known from male adult stage only. This species is known from the States of Paraná and Rio de Janeiro along the Brazilian Atlantic Forest.

The types/biological type of the known species are housed in São Paulo, Brazil and Bergen, Norway.

The etymology of the genus is from the Greek "lyre", meaning lyre, referring to the shape of the anal point; "cladius" stands as a common ending among Orthocladiinae.
