= Mesosmittia =

Scientific classification
- Domain: Eukaryota
- Kingdom: Animalia
- Phylum: Arthropoda
- Class: Insecta
- Order: Diptera
- Family: Chironomidae
- Subfamily: Orthocladiinae
- Genus: Mesosmittia; Brundin, 1956

Genus of insects

The genus Mesosmittia is cosmopolitan, thus occurring in all biogeographical regions except for Antarctica. Almost nothing or very little is known about its ecology, the larva of one species was described by Strenze (1950) as terrestrial, but adults can be collected using emergence traps set over rivulets.

The genus was recently revised for the Neotropics with descriptions of new species.

The genus comprises:

- M. acutistylus Sæther, recorded from United States and Mexico.
- M. annae Andersen & Mendes, recorded from Guatemala and Mexico.
- M. flexuella (Edwards), recorded from all over Europe.
- M. glabra Andersen & Mendes, recorded from Ecuador.
- M. guanajensis Andersen & Mendes, recorded from Mexico.
- M. hirta Andersen & Mendes, recorded from Ecuador, only the holotype is known.
- M. lobiga Sæther, recorded from United States and Mexico.
- M. museophila Donato, recorded from South America.
- M. patrihortae Sæther, recorded from various locations in the Neotropics, United States, China, and South Africa.
- M. prolixa Sæther, recorded from United States and Mexico.
- M. tora Sæther, recorded from United States and Mexico.
- M. truncata Sæther, recorded from Panama, only the holotype is known.
