= Acamptocladius =

Scientific classification
- Kingdom: Animalia
- Phylum: Arthropoda
- Clade: Pancrustacea
- Class: Insecta
- Order: Diptera
- Family: Chironomidae
- Subfamily: Orthocladiinae
- Genus: Acamptocladius van der Wulp, 1874

Genus of flies

Acamptocladius is a genus of non-biting midges in the subfamily Orthocladiinae of the bloodworm family Chironomidae.

== Species ==
- A. reissi Cranston & Sæther, 1982
- A. submontanus (Edwards, 1932)
