= Australopelopia =

Scientific classification
- Domain: Eukaryota
- Kingdom: Animalia
- Phylum: Arthropoda
- Class: Insecta
- Order: Diptera
- Family: Chironomidae
- Subfamily: Orthocladiinae
- Genus: Australopelopia

Genus of flies

Australopelopia is a genus of non-biting midges of the bloodworm family Chironomidae.
