= Cardiocladius =

Scientific classification
- Kingdom: Animalia
- Phylum: Arthropoda
- Class: Insecta
- Order: Diptera
- Family: Chironomidae
- Genus: Cardiocladius; Kieffer, 1912

Genus of flies

Cardiocladius is a genus of non-biting midges in the subfamily Orthocladiinae of the bloodworm family (Chironomidae).
