= Murraycladius =

Scientific classification
- Domain: Eukaryota
- Kingdom: Animalia
- Phylum: Arthropoda
- Class: Insecta
- Order: Diptera
- Family: Chironomidae
- Genus: Murraycladius; Ashe & O'Connor, 2007
- Species: M. patwallacei

Binomial name
- Murraycladius patwallacei Ashe & O'Connor, 2007

Genus of flies

Murraycladius is a genus of midges in the family Chironomidae. There is one at least described species in Murraycladius, M. patwallacei.
