= Thienemannia =

Scientific classification
- Kingdom: Animalia
- Phylum: Arthropoda
- Class: Insecta
- Order: Diptera
- Family: Chironomidae
- Subfamily: Orthocladiinae
- Genus: Thienemannia; Kieffer, 1909

Species
- Thienemannia gracilis Kieffer, 1909 T. spiesi

Genus of flies

Thienemannia is a genus of non-biting midges of the bloodworm family Chironomidae.
