= Parametriocnemus =

Scientific classification
- Kingdom: Animalia
- Phylum: Arthropoda
- Class: Insecta
- Order: Diptera
- Family: Chironomidae
- Subfamily: Orthocladiinae
- Genus: Parametriocnemus; Goetghebeur, 1932

Genus of flies

Parametriocnemus is a genus of non-biting midges, distributed world-wide (except Antarctica), in the subfamily Orthocladiinae of the family (Chironomidae).
