= Unniella =

Scientific classification
- Domain: Eukaryota
- Kingdom: Animalia
- Phylum: Arthropoda
- Class: Insecta
- Order: Diptera
- Family: Chironomidae
- Subfamily: Orthocladiinae
- Genus: Unniella; Sæther, 1982

Genus of flies

Unniella is a genus of non-biting midges of the bloodworm family Chironomidae.
