= Tvetenia =

Scientific classification
- Kingdom: Animalia
- Phylum: Arthropoda
- Class: Insecta
- Order: Diptera
- Family: Chironomidae
- Subfamily: Orthocladiinae
- Genus: Tvetenia; Kieffer, 1922

Genus of flies

Tvetenia is a genus of non-biting midges of the bloodworm family Chironomidae. Species can be found in Europe, including Croatia.
