= Baeoctenus =

Scientific classification
- Kingdom: Animalia
- Phylum: Arthropoda
- Class: Insecta
- Order: Diptera
- Family: Chironomidae
- Subfamily: Orthocladiinae
- Genus: Baeoctenus; Sæther, 1976

Type species
- Baeoctenus bicolor Sæther, 1976

Genus of flies

Baeoctenus is a genus of European non-biting midges in the subfamily Orthocladiinae of the bloodworm family. The larvae in their third instar invade the gills of mussels.

== Species ==
- B. bicolor Sæther, 1976
