= Thienemanniella =

Scientific classification
- Kingdom: Animalia
- Phylum: Arthropoda
- Class: Insecta
- Order: Diptera
- Family: Chironomidae
- Subfamily: Orthocladiinae
- Genus: Thienemanniella; Kieffer, 1911

Genus of flies

Thienemanniella is a genus of non-biting midges of the bloodworm family Chironomidae.
