= August Holmgren =

August Holmgren may refer to:

- August Holmgren (zoologist) (1829–1888), Swedish entomologist
- August Holmgren (tennis) (born 1998), Danish tennis player
