= Tokunagaia =

Scientific classification
- Kingdom: Animalia
- Phylum: Arthropoda
- Class: Insecta
- Order: Diptera
- Family: Chironomidae
- Subfamily: Orthocladiinae
- Genus: Tokunagaia; Sæther, 1973

Genus of flies

Tokunagaia is a genus of European non-biting midges in the subfamily Orthocladiinae of the bloodworm family (Chironomidae). It contains around 50 species, and was erected for Spaniotoma (Orthocladius) kibunensis.
