= Boreosmittia =

Scientific classification
- Kingdom: Animalia
- Phylum: Arthropoda
- Clade: Pancrustacea
- Class: Insecta
- Order: Diptera
- Family: Chironomidae
- Subfamily: Orthocladiinae
- Genus: Boreosmittia; Tuiskunen, 1986

Genus of flies

Boreosmittia is a genus of European non-biting midges in the subfamily Orthocladiinae of the bloodworm family (Chironomidae).

== Species ==
- A. protensa Sæther, 2000
- A. sivertseni (Aagaard, 1979)
