= Paracladius =

Scientific classification
- Kingdom: Animalia
- Phylum: Arthropoda
- Class: Insecta
- Order: Diptera
- Family: Chironomidae
- Subfamily: Orthocladiinae
- Genus: Paracladius; Hirvenoja, 1973

Genus of flies

Paracladius is a genus of European non-biting midges in the subfamily Orthocladiinae of the bloodworm family.

== Distribution ==
Members of the genus have been primarily found in Turkey.
