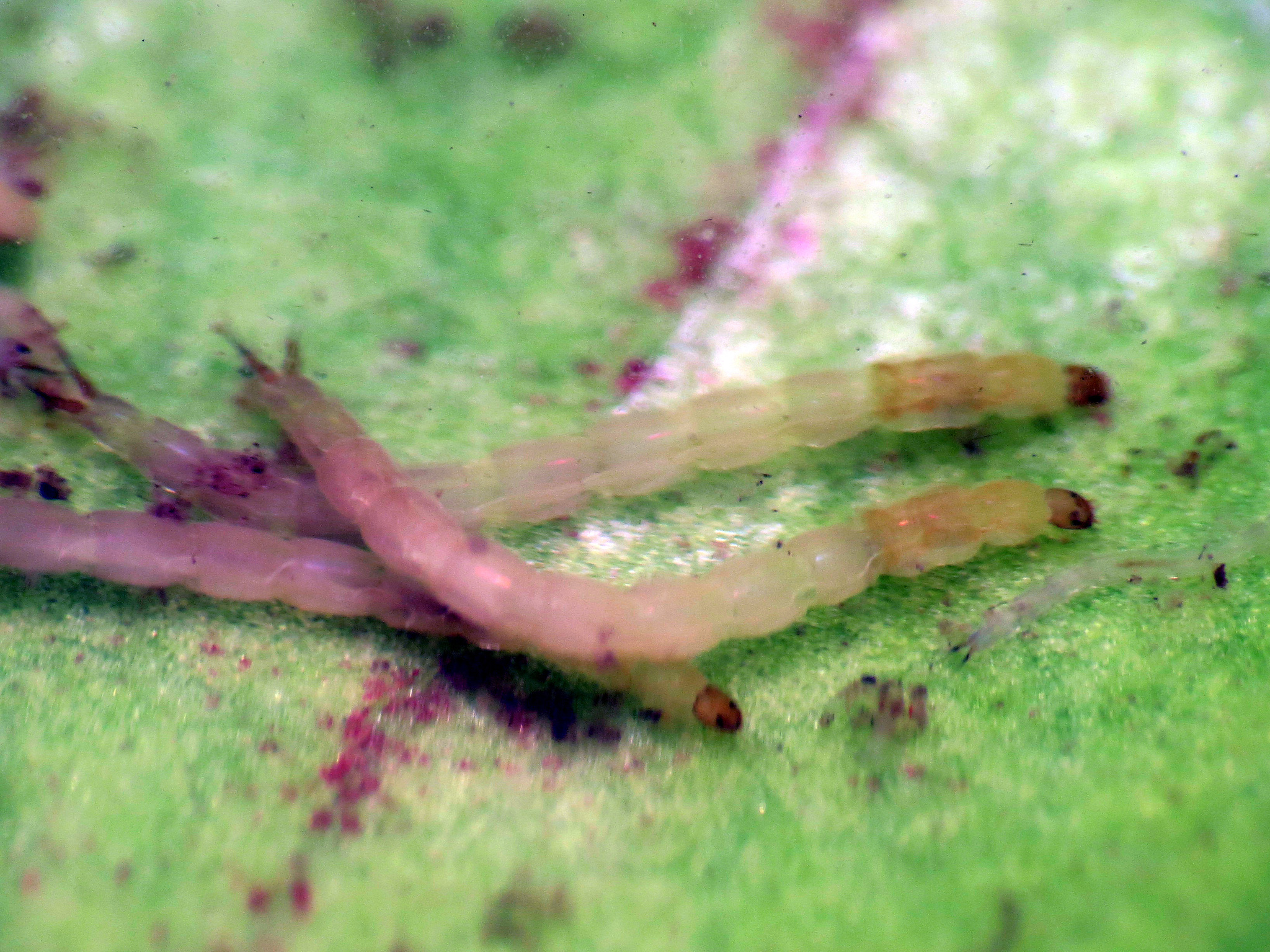
- Metriocnemus knabi larvae

Scientific classification
- Kingdom: Animalia
- Phylum: Arthropoda
- Clade: Pancrustacea
- Class: Insecta
- Order: Diptera
- Family: Chironomidae
- Genus: Metriocnemus
- Species: M. knabi

Binomial name
- Metriocnemus knabi Coquillett, 1904

= Metriocnemus knabi =

Species of fly

Metriocnemus knabi, the pitcher plant midge, is an inquiline midge found only in the phytotelma of the purple pitcher plant, Sarracenia purpurea. In this microcommunity of bacteria, rotifers, protozoa, and other dipteran larva like Wyeomyia smithii, M. knabi specializes by feeding mostly on the carcasses of drowned insects captured by the plant that collect at the bottom of the pitcher. Metriocnemus knabi occurs widely across the North American range of its host, from Florida in the south through eastern Canada in the north and as far west as Alberta.
