= Zalutschia =

Scientific classification
- Kingdom: Animalia
- Phylum: Arthropoda
- Class: Insecta
- Order: Diptera
- Family: Chironomidae
- Subfamily: Orthocladiinae
- Genus: Zalutschia; Lipina, 1939

Genus of midges

Zalutschia is a genus of non-biting midges of the bloodworm family Chironomidae.
