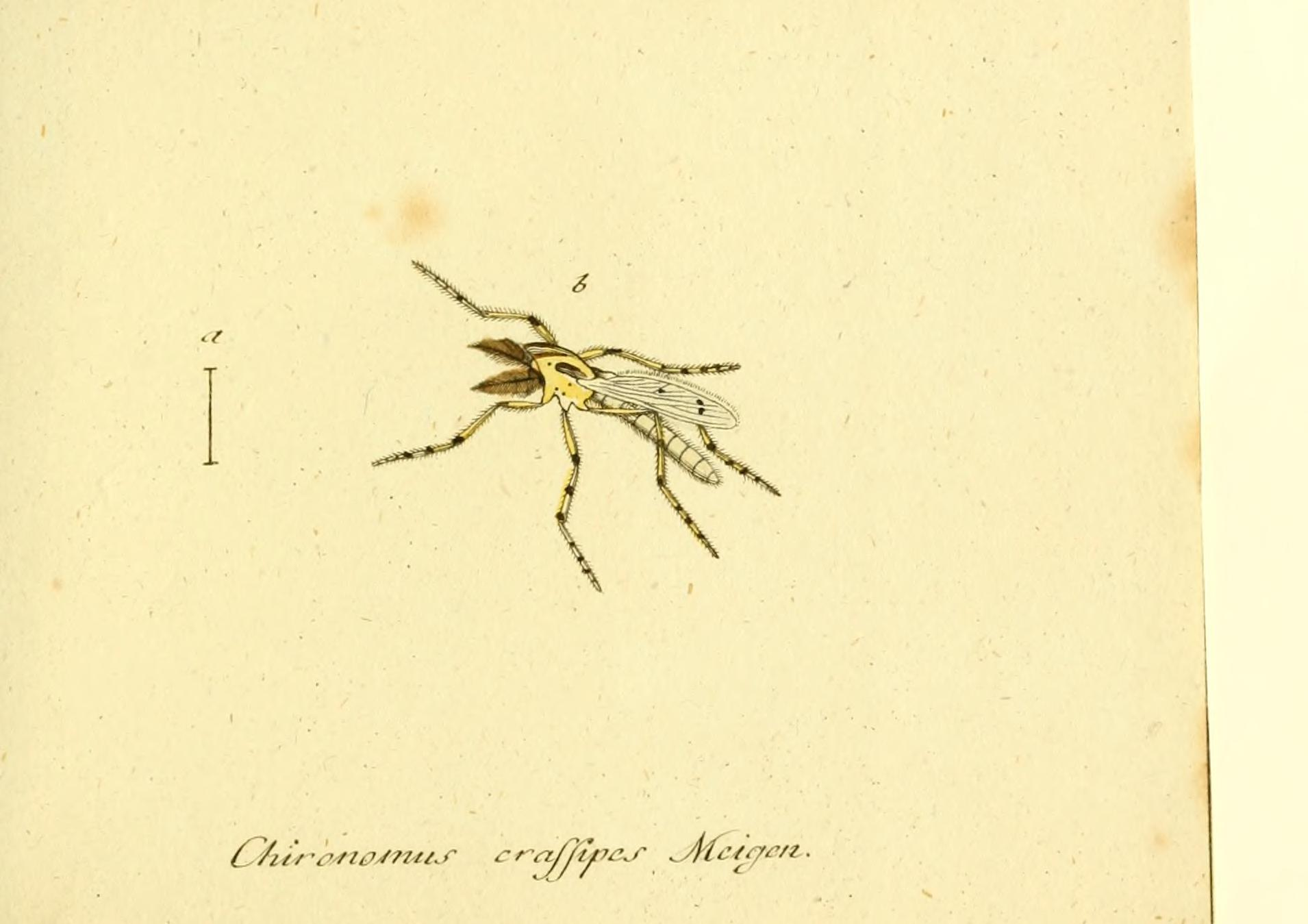
- Eurycnemus crassipes by Jacob Sturm

Scientific classification
- Domain: Eukaryota
- Kingdom: Animalia
- Phylum: Arthropoda
- Class: Insecta
- Order: Diptera
- Family: Chironomidae
- Subfamily: Orthocladiinae
- Genus: Eurycnemus van der Wulp, 1874

Species
- Eurycnemus amamiapiatus Sasa, 1991; Eurycnemus crassipes (Meigen, 1813); Eurycnemus hidakacedea Sasa & Suzuki, 2000; Eurycnemus nozakii Kobayashi, 1998

= Eurycnemus =

Genus of flies

Eurycnemus is a genus of European non-biting midges in the subfamily Orthocladiinae of the bloodworm family (Chironomidae).
