= Abiskomyia =

Scientific classification
- Kingdom: Animalia
- Phylum: Arthropoda
- Class: Insecta
- Order: Diptera
- Family: Chironomidae
- Subfamily: Orthocladiinae
- Genus: Abiskomyia; Edwards, 1937

Type species
- Abiskomyia virgo Edwards, 1937

Genus of flies

Abiskomyia is a genus of Eurasian non-biting midges in the bloodworm family (Chironomidae).

== Species ==
There are six recognized species:

- Abiskomyia korbokhon Makarchenko & Makarchenko, 2015
- Abiskomyia levanidovi Makarchenko & Makarchenko, 2015
- Abiskomyia orientalis Makarchenko & Makarchenko, 2015
- Abiskomyia paravirgo Goetghebuer, 1940
- Abiskomyia rivalis Makarchenko & Makarchenko, 2015
- Abiskomyia virgo Edwards, 1937
