= Heterotrissocladius =

Scientific classification
- Kingdom: Animalia
- Phylum: Arthropoda
- Class: Insecta
- Order: Diptera
- Family: Chironomidae
- Subfamily: Orthocladiinae
- Genus: Heterotrissocladius; Spärck, 1923

Genus of flies

Heterotrissocladius is a genus of European non-biting midges in the subfamily Orthocladiinae of the bloodworm family (Chironomidae). Larvae of species in this genus have been found at the bottom of Crater Lake. Eggs are laid on the surface of the water, before sinking to the bottom. There, the larvae feed on the sediment, before swimming to the surface, pupating, and emerging as adults.
