= Allocladius =

Scientific classification
- Domain: Eukaryota
- Kingdom: Animalia
- Phylum: Arthropoda
- Class: Insecta
- Order: Diptera
- Family: Chironomidae
- Genus: Allocladius; Kieffer, 1913

Genus of flies

Allocladius is a genus of flies belonging to the family Chironomidae.

The genus has almost cosmopolitan distribution.

Species:

- Allocladius fortispinatus
- Allocladius globosus
