= Gymnometriocnemus =

Scientific classification
- Kingdom: Animalia
- Phylum: Arthropoda
- Class: Insecta
- Order: Diptera
- Family: Chironomidae
- Subfamily: Orthocladiinae
- Genus: Gymnometriocnemus; Goetghebeur, 1932

Genus of flies

Gymnometriocnemus is a genus of non-biting midges in the subfamily Orthocladiinae of the bloodworm family (Chironomidae). The genus is divided into two subgenera, Raphidocladius Sæther 1983 (four species - brumalis, kamimegavirgus, tairaprimus and volitans) and Gymnometriocnemus Goetghebuer, 1932 (eleven species - ancudensis, benoiti, brevitarsis, johanasecundus, lobifer, longicostalis, subnudus, terrestris, mahensis, nitidulus and wilsoni) (Ashe and O’Connor 2012). Males of the former subgenus are characterized by possessing an extremely long virga with needle-like sclerotization, species of the later characterized by a short virga and a weakly developed crista dorsalis in the adult male hypopygium (Stur and Ekrem 2015).
