= Aphroteniinae =

Scientific classification
- Kingdom: Animalia
- Phylum: Arthropoda
- Class: Insecta
- Order: Diptera
- Family: Chironomidae
- Subfamily: Aphroteniinae; Brundin 1966

Subfamily of non-biting midges

Aphroteniinae is a subfamily of nonbiting midges in the family Chironomidae. There are at least 4 genera and about 10 described species in Aphroteniinae.

== Genera ==
The subfamily Aphroteniinae contains the following genera and species:

Subfamily Aphroteniinae
Genus Anaphrotenia Brundin, 1983

Anaphrotenia lacustris Brundin, 1983

Genus Aphrotenia Brundin, 1966

Aphrotenia australiensis Hergstrom, 1992
Aphrotenia barnardi Brundin, 1966
Aphrotenia tsitsikamae Brundin, 1966

Genus Aphroteniella Brundin, 1966

Aphroteniella filicornis Brundin, 1966
Aphroteniella tenuicornis Brundin, 1966

Genus Paraphrotenia Brundin, 1966

Paraphrotenia excellens Brundin, 1966
Paraphrotenia fascipennis Brundin, 1966
Paraphrotenia multispinosa Brundin, 1966
Paraphrotenia umbraculata (Brundin, 1966)
