= Krenosmittia =

Scientific classification
- Kingdom: Animalia
- Phylum: Arthropoda
- Class: Insecta
- Order: Diptera
- Family: Chironomidae
- Subfamily: Orthocladiinae
- Genus: Krenosmittia; Thienemann & Krüger, 1939

Genus of flies

Krenosmittia is a genus of European non-biting midges in the subfamily Orthocladiinae of the bloodworm family (Chironomidae). Among the 20 species in the genus, 6 species are found in Japan, 4 are found in China, and 5 are found in Russia.
