= Heleniella =

Scientific classification
- Kingdom: Animalia
- Phylum: Arthropoda
- Class: Insecta
- Order: Diptera
- Family: Chironomidae
- Subfamily: Orthocladiinae
- Genus: Heleniella van der Wulp, 1874

Species
- Heleniella curtistila; Heleniella ornaticollis

Genus of flies

Heleniella is a genus of European non-biting midges in the subfamily Orthocladiinae of the bloodworm family (Chironomidae).
