= Austrobrillia =

Scientific classification
- Domain: Eukaryota
- Kingdom: Animalia
- Phylum: Arthropoda
- Class: Insecta
- Order: Diptera
- Family: Chironomidae
- Subfamily: Orthocladiinae
- Genus: Austrobrillia; Freeman, 1961

Type species
- Austrobrillia longipes Freeman, 1961

Genus of midges

Austrobrillia is a genus of chironomid midges. For many years there was a single described species, A. longipes of Australia, but in 2000 two further South American species were described from pupal exuviae.

== Species ==
- A. chilensis Cranston, 2000
- A. longipes Freeman, 1961
- A. valereissia Cranston, 2000
