= Paracricotopus =

Scientific classification
- Kingdom: Animalia
- Phylum: Arthropoda
- Class: Insecta
- Order: Diptera
- Family: Chironomidae
- Subfamily: Orthocladiinae
- Genus: Paracricotopus; Brundin, 1956

Synonyms
- Paracricotopus Thienemann & Harnisch, 1932

Genus of flies

Paracricotopus is a genus of European non-biting midges in the subfamily Orthocladiinae of the bloodworm family (Chironomidae).

== Species ==
The genus includes the following species:

- Paracricotopus davoodi Ghaderi, Ibrahami, Mohammadi & Namayandeh, 2023
- Paracricotopus glaber Saether, 1980
- Paracricotopus insulatus Bhattacharyay & Chaudhuri, 1988
- Paracricotopus irregularis Niitsuma, 1990
- Paracricotopus millrockensis Caldwell, 1985
- Paracricotopus missilus Chaudhuri & Som, 1998
- Paracricotopus mozleyi Steiner, 1983
- Paracricotopus niger Kieffer, 1913
- Paracricotopus oyabeangulatus Sasa, Kawai & Ueno, 1988
- Paracricotopus spinicornis Hazra & Chaudhuri, 2002
- Paracricotopus sturae Namayandeh & Ghaderi, 2025
- Paracricotopus tamabrevis Sasa, 1983
- Paracricotopus togakuroasi Sasa & Okazawa, 1992
- Paracricotopus torbjorni Namayandeh & Ghaderi, 2025
- Paracricotopus uliginosus Brundin, 1947
