= Parorthocladius =

Scientific classification
- Kingdom: Animalia
- Phylum: Arthropoda
- Class: Insecta
- Order: Diptera
- Family: Chironomidae
- Subfamily: Orthocladiinae
- Genus: Parorthocladius; Thienemann, 1935

Genus of flies

Parorthocladius is a genus of European non-biting midges in the subfamily Orthocladiinae of the bloodworm family (Chironomidae).
