= Georthocladius =

Scientific classification
- Kingdom: Animalia
- Phylum: Arthropoda
- Class: Insecta
- Order: Diptera
- Family: Chironomidae
- Subfamily: Orthocladiinae
- Genus: Georthocladius; Strenzke, 1941

Genus of flies

Georthocladius is a genus of European non-biting midges in the subfamily Orthocladiinae, within the bloodworm family Chironomidae.
