= Camptocladius =

Scientific classification
- Kingdom: Animalia
- Phylum: Arthropoda
- Class: Insecta
- Order: Diptera
- Family: Chironomidae
- Subfamily: Orthocladiinae
- Genus: Camptocladius van der Wulp, 1874

Genus of flies

Camptocladius is a genus of European non-biting midges in the subfamily Orthocladiinae of the bloodworm family (Chironomidae). Its identifiable through its wedge-shaped flagellomere setae.
