= Saetheriella =

Scientific classification
- Kingdom: Animalia
- Phylum: Arthropoda
- Class: Insecta
- Order: Diptera
- Family: Chironomidae
- Subfamily: Orthocladiinae
- Genus: Saetheriella; Halvorsen, 1982

Type species
- Saetheriella amplicristata Halvorsen, 1982

Species
- See text

Genus of flies

Saetheriella is a genus of North American non-biting midges in the subfamily Orthocladiinae of the bloodworm family (Chironomidae).

== Genera & Species ==
- S. amplicristata Halvorsen, 1982
