= Alotanypus =

Scientific classification
- Domain: Eukaryota
- Kingdom: Animalia
- Phylum: Arthropoda
- Class: Insecta
- Order: Diptera
- Family: Chironomidae
- Subfamily: Tanypodinae
- Tribe: Macropelopini
- Genus: Alotanypus; Roback, 1971

Type species
- Tanypus venustus Coquillett, 1902

Synonyms
- Gressitius Sublette & Wirth, 1980; Guassutanypus Roque & Trivinho-Strixino, 2003

Genus of flies

Alotanypus is a genus of non-biting midges of the bloodworm family Chironomidae.

== Species ==
- A. antarcticus (Hudson, 1892)
- A. aris Roback, 1971
- A. dalyupensis (Freeman, 1961)
- A. kuroberobustus (Sasa & Okazawa, 1992)
- A. oliveirai (Roque & Trivinho-Strixino, 2003)
- A. umbrosus (Freeman, 1959)
- A. venustus (Coquillett, 1902)
- A. vittigera (Edwards, 1931)
- A. wilhelmensis Silva, 2016
