= Halocladius =

Scientific classification
- Kingdom: Animalia
- Phylum: Arthropoda
- Clade: Pancrustacea
- Class: Insecta
- Order: Diptera
- Family: Chironomidae
- Subfamily: Orthocladiinae
- Genus: Halocladius; Hirvenoja, 1973

Type species
- Chironomus varians Stæger, 1839

Genus of flies

Halocladius is a genus of halophilic, non-biting midges in the subfamily Orthocladiinae of the bloodworm family (Chironomidae). They inhabit seashores and saline inland waters of the Northern Hemisphere. Wing length is 1.5–3.5 mm (0.06–0.14 in). Two subgenera have been described: Halocladius and Psammocladius.

== Species ==
There are five or six species:

- Halocladius braunsi (Goetghebuer, 1942)
- Halocladius fucicola (Edwards, 1926)
- Halocladius mediterraneus Hirvenoja, 1973
- Halocladius millenarius (Santos Abreu, 1918)
- Halocladius variabilis (Stæger, 1839)
- Halocladius varians (Stæger, 1839)

== Halocladius variabilis ==
The most widespread species is Halocladius variabilis, known from Canada, northern Europe, and the Mediterranean and Black Seas. The larvae can grow to 12 mm (0.5 in) in length. In Nova Scotia, life cycle is univoltine, possibly bivoltine. It is a commensal, potentially symbiotic with marine algae: the larvae feed on diatoms fouling its host, possibly delivering nutrients via faecal material. Typical host is brown alga Elachista fucicola, growing itself on Ascophyllum nodosum, although other primary and secondary hosts occur too. Typically, a single larva occupies one Elachista fucicola thallus.

In the Baltic, adults emerge between mid-May and late June. Densities of emerging adults as high as 328 individuals/m^{2} have been observed, although 10 individuals/m^{2} is more typical. Much higher larval densities, more than 50,000 individuals/m^{2}, have been reported from rocky intertidal zone of Nova Scotia.
