= Orthocladius =

Scientific classification
- Kingdom: Animalia
- Phylum: Arthropoda
- Clade: Pancrustacea
- Class: Insecta
- Order: Diptera
- Family: Chironomidae
- Subfamily: Orthocladiinae
- Genus: Orthocladius van der Wulp, 1874

Genus of flies

Orthocladius is a genus of non-biting midges in the subfamily Orthocladiinae of the bloodworm family Chironomidae.
