= Rheocricotopus =

Scientific classification
- Kingdom: Animalia
- Phylum: Arthropoda
- Clade: Pancrustacea
- Class: Insecta
- Order: Diptera
- Family: Chironomidae
- Subfamily: Orthocladiinae
- Genus: Rheocricotopus; Brundin, 1956

Genus of flies

Rheocricotopus is a genus of European non-biting midges in the subfamily Orthocladiinae of the bloodworm family (Chironomidae).
