= Parachaetocladius =

Scientific classification
- Kingdom: Animalia
- Phylum: Arthropoda
- Class: Insecta
- Order: Diptera
- Superfamily: Chironomoidea
- Family: Chironomidae
- Subfamily: Orthocladiinae
- Genus: Parachaetocladius; Wülker, 1959

Genus of flies

Parachaetocladius is a genus of non-biting midges in the subfamily Orthocladiinae of the bloodworm family (Chironomidae). It was first described in 1959 by Wolfgang Wülker. The genus description was revised in 2020.

== Species ==
Species listed by GBIF As of 6 October 2025:

- Parachaetocladius abnobaeus (Wülker, 1959)
- Parachaetocladius akanoctavus Sasa & Kamimura, 1987
- Parachaetocladius balticus Seredszus & Wichard, 2007
- Parachaetocladius broankerothurrie Namayandeh & Beresford, 2020
- Parachaetocladius hirtipectus Saether, 1969
- Parachaetocladius hudsoni (Saether, 1977)
- Parachaetocladius imberbus Saether & Sublette, 1983
- Parachaetocladius pyrenaeus Moubayed, 2020
- Parachaetocladius squamula Liu & Cao, 2020
