= Chilenomyia =

Scientific classification
- Kingdom: Animalia
- Phylum: Arthropoda
- Class: Insecta
- Order: Diptera
- Family: Chironomidae
- Subfamily: Chilenomyiinae; Brundin, 1983
- Genus: Chilenomyia; Brundin, 1983
- Species: C. paradoxa

Binomial name
- Chilenomyia paradoxa Brundin, 1983

Genus of non-biting midges

Chilenomyia is a genus of nonbiting midges in the family Chironomidae. This genus has a single species, Chilenomyia paradoxa, found in the Neotropics.
