= Rheosmittia =

Scientific classification
- Kingdom: Animalia
- Phylum: Arthropoda
- Class: Insecta
- Order: Diptera
- Family: Chironomidae
- Subfamily: Orthocladiinae
- Genus: Rheosmittia; Brundin, 1956

Genus of flies

Rheosmittia is a genus of European non-biting midges in the subfamily Orthocladiinae of the bloodworm family Chironomidae. They are usually found the substrates of rivers and streams.
