= Thalassosmittia =

Scientific classification
- Kingdom: Animalia
- Phylum: Arthropoda
- Class: Insecta
- Order: Diptera
- Family: Chironomidae
- Subfamily: Orthocladiinae
- Genus: Thalassosmittia; Strenzke & Remmert, 1957

Genus of flies

Thalassosmittia is a genus of European non-biting midges in the subfamily Orthocladiinae of the bloodworm family (Chironomidae).

== Species ==
- Thalassosmittia montana
- Thalassosmittia nemalione
