= Xylotopus =

Scientific classification
- Domain: Eukaryota
- Kingdom: Animalia
- Phylum: Arthropoda
- Class: Insecta
- Order: Diptera
- Family: Chironomidae
- Subfamily: Orthocladiinae
- Genus: Xylotopus; Oliver

Genus of flies

Xylotopus is a genus of midges in the family Chironomidae. There are at least two described species in Xylotopus.

== Species ==
These two species belong to the genus Xylotopus:

- Xylotopus burmanesis Oliver, 1985
- Xylotopus par (Coquiletti, 1901)
