= Pseudokiefferiella =

Scientific classification
- Domain: Eukaryota
- Kingdom: Animalia
- Phylum: Arthropoda
- Class: Insecta
- Order: Diptera
- Family: Chironomidae
- Subfamily: Chironominae
- Genus: Pseudokiefferiella; Zavrel, 1941

Genus of flies

Pseudokiefferiella is a genus of European non-biting midges in the subfamily Chironominae of the bloodworm family Chironomidae.
