= Vivacricotopus =

Scientific classification
- Domain: Eukaryota
- Kingdom: Animalia
- Phylum: Arthropoda
- Class: Insecta
- Order: Diptera
- Family: Chironomidae
- Genus: Vivacricotopus; Schnell & Saether, 1988

Genus of flies

Vivacricotopus is a genus of flies belonging to the family Chironomidae.

The species of this genus are found in Southern Europe.

Species:

- Vivacricotopus ablusus Schnell & Saether, 1988
- Vivacricotopus elgandzha Makarchenko & Makarchenko, 2005
