= August Holmgren (zoologist) =

Swedish entomologist

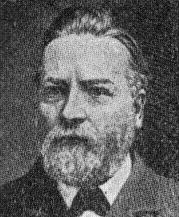
August Emil Holmgren

August Emil Algot Holmgren (10 November 1829 – 30 December 1888) was a Swedish entomologist mainly interested in the Hymenoptera, especially Ichneumonidae.

He was professor in the Forstakademie in Stockholm.

Holmgren was the author of:

- Hymenoptera, species novas descripsit. Kongliga Svenska Fregatten Eugenies resa omkring Jordeni under befäl af C.A. Virgen Aren 1851–53. II Zoologi 1 Insecta pp. 391-442 pl. viii. (1868). BHL
- Bidrag till kännedomen om Beeren eilands och Spetsbegrens insekt-fauna. Stockholm: P.A. Norstedt & söner (1869).
- Skandinaviens foglar (Birds of Sweden) in Handbok i zoologi för landtbrukare, skogshushållare, fiskeriidkare och jägare P.A. Norstedt & söner, Stockholm (1866).
