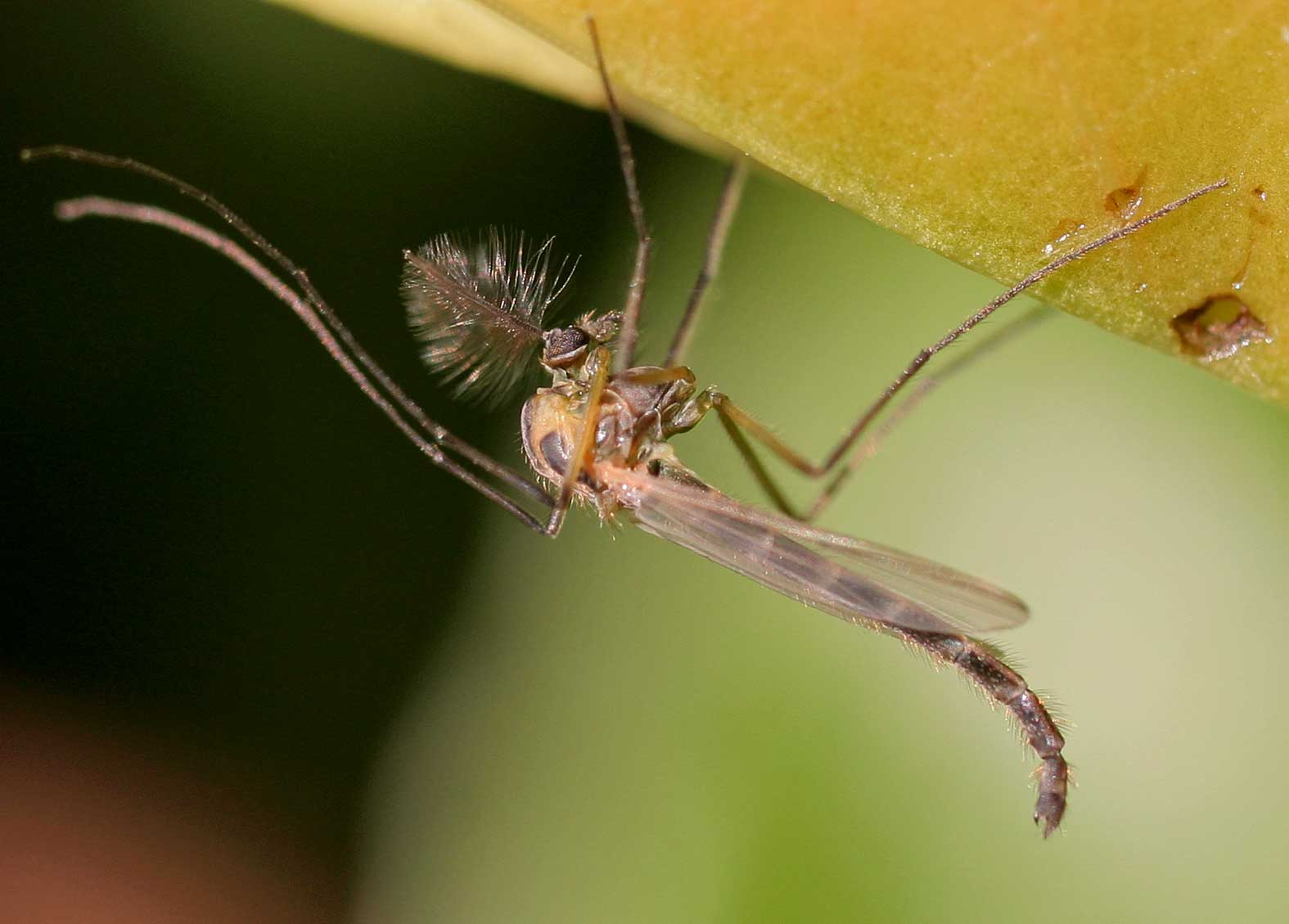
- Male Chironomus plumosus

Scientific classification
- Kingdom: Animalia
- Phylum: Arthropoda
- Clade: Pancrustacea
- Class: Insecta
- Order: Diptera
- Suborder: Nematocera
- Infraorder: Culicomorpha
- Superfamily: Chironomoidea
- Family: Chironomidae; Newman, 1834

Subfamilies
- See text

= Chironomidae =

Chironomidae Temporal range: Triassic–Present

Family of flies

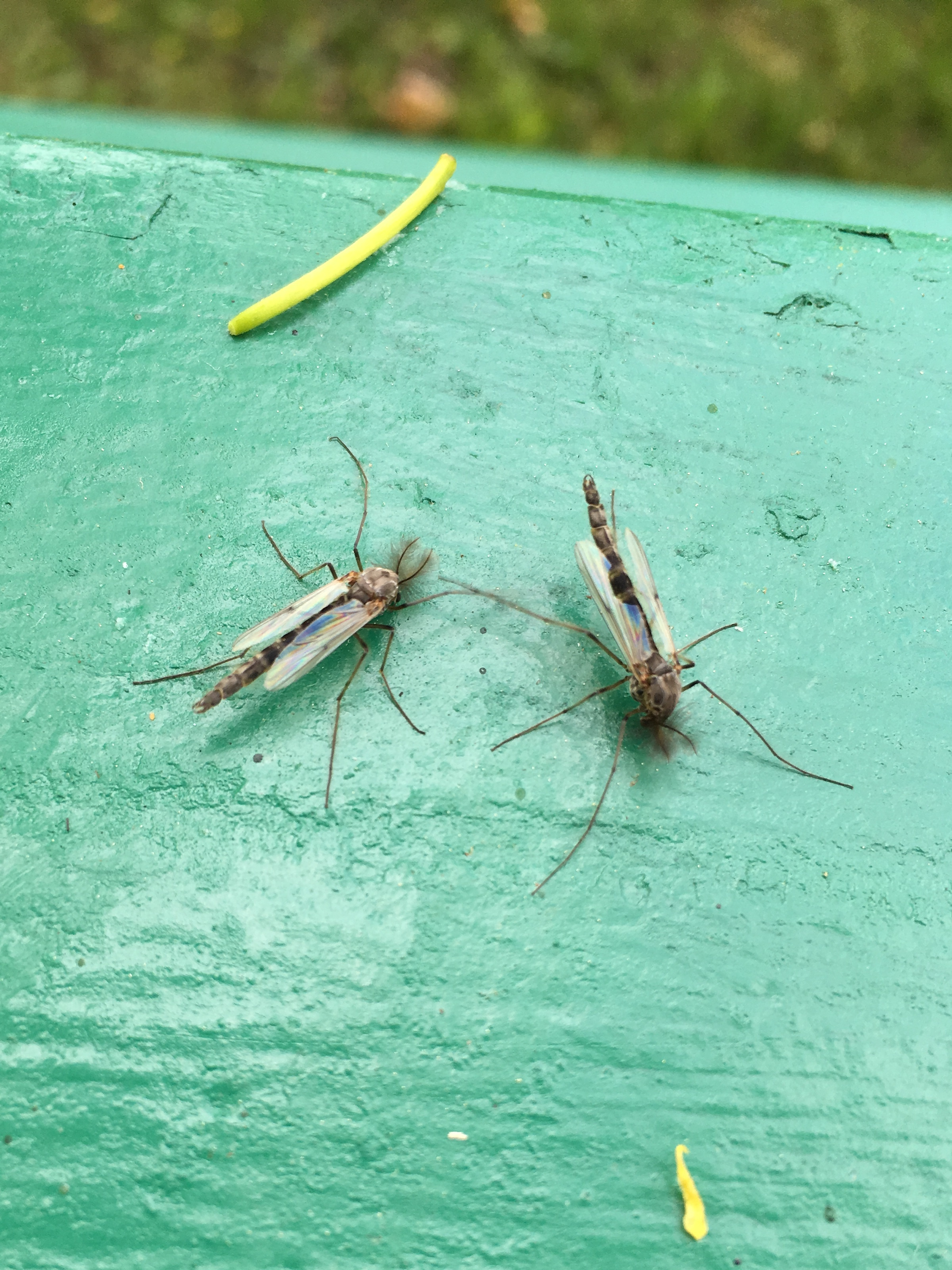
Two lake flies observed in Neenah, Wisconsin, after the yearly hatch in Lake Winnebago

Chironomidae /ˌkaɪrəˈnɒmɪdiː/, commonly known as non-biting midges or chironomids /kaɪˈrɒnəmɪdz/, are a family of Nematoceran flies with a global distribution. They are closely related to the families Ceratopogonidae, Simuliidae, and Thaumaleidae. Although many chironomid species superficially resemble mosquitoes, they can be distinguished by the absence of the wing scales and elongated mouthparts characteristic of the Culicidae (true mosquitoes).

The name Chironomidae stems from the Ancient Greek word ''kheironómos'', "a pantomimist".

== Common names and biodiversity ==
Chironomidae are a large taxon of insects. Some estimates of the species numbers suggest well over 10,000 worldwide. Males are easily recognized by their plumose antennae. Adults are known by a variety of vague and inconsistent common names, largely by confusion with other insects. For example, chironomids are known as "lake flies" in parts of Canada and Lake Winnebago, Wisconsin, "bay flies" in the areas near the bay of Green Bay, Wisconsin, and "mayflies" near Madison, Wisconsin. They are called "sand flies," "muckleheads," "muffleheads," "Canadian soldiers," or "American soldiers" in various regions of the Great Lakes area. They have been called "blind mosquitoes" or "chizzywinks" in Florida. In Kansas, they are known as "midges." However, they are not mosquitoes of any sort, and the term "sandflies" generally refers to various species of biting flies unrelated to the Chironomidae.

The group includes the wingless Belgica antarctica, the largest terrestrial animal of Antarctica.

Their larvae produce silk, and Chironomus have been studied as an alternative source of silk other than the silk moth, as it is possible to extract it without killing the animal (Ahimsa silk).

The biodiversity of the Chironomidae often goes unnoticed because they are notoriously difficult to identify, and ecologists usually record them by species groups or complexes. Each morphologically distinct group comprises a number of morphologically identical (sibling) species that can only be identified by rearing adult males or by cytogenetic analysis of the polytene chromosomes. Polytene chromosomes were originally observed in the larval salivary glands of Chironomus midges by Balbiani in 1881. They form through repeated rounds of DNA replication without cell division, resulting in characteristic light and dark banding patterns which can be used to identify inversions and deletions which allow species identification. Alternatively, DNA barcoding is able to distinguish most species in many taxonomic groups using divergence patterns of commonly-studied gene regions.

== Fossil record ==
The oldest chironomid fossil, Aenne triassica, dates back to the Late Triassic epoch. By the Late Cretaceous, chironomids were highly diverse. Tanytarsins appear in the fossil record during the Middle Eocene.

== Behavior and description ==
Chironomids as a group are very diverse in their life histories, and exhibit a variety of behaviors during their development. Due to their species ambiguity and this diversity of behaviors, there is much controversy in research on their feeding habits, particularly as adults.

Many reference sources in the past century or so have repeated the assertion that the chironomidae do not feed as adults, but an increasing body of evidence contradicts this view. Adults of many species do, in fact, feed. The natural foods reported include fresh fly droppings, nectar, pollen, honeydew, and various sugar-rich materials.

The question whether feeding is of practical importance has by now been clearly settled for some Chironomus species, at least; specimens that had fed on sucrose flew far longer than starved specimens, and starved females longer than starved males, which suggested they had eclosed with larger reserves of energy than the males. Some authors suggest the females and males of certain species apply the resources obtained in feeding differently. Generally, males expend the extra energy on flight, while females use their food resources to achieve longer lifespans. The respective strategies should be compatible with maximal probability of successful mating and reproduction in those species that do not mate immediately after eclosion, particularly in species that have more than one egg mass maturing, the less developed masses being oviposited after a delay. Such variables also would be relevant to species that exploit wind for dispersal, laying eggs at intervals. Chironomids that feed on nectar or pollen may well be of importance as pollinators, but current evidence on such points is largely anecdotal. However, the content of protein and other nutrients in pollen, in comparison to nectar, might well contribute to the females' reproductive capacities.

Larvae of some species are bright red in color due to a hemoglobin analog; these are often known as "bloodworms". Their ability to capture oxygen is further increased by making undulating movements.

Adults can be pests when they emerge in large numbers. They may cause difficulty during driving if they collide with the windshield, creating an opaque coating which obscures the driver's vision. They can damage paint, brick, and other surfaces with their droppings. When large numbers of adults die, they can build up into malodorous piles. They can provoke allergic reactions in sensitive individuals. These allergic reactions have been shown to be caused by the haemoglobins that are primarily found in Chironomidae larval stages.

== Ecology and distribution ==
Chironomids are highly versatile species that can tolerate a very wide range of environmental stresses. They are found in high abundances in many of the habitats they live in, and represent important food sources for a variety of organisms. In addition, they are found representing a significant number of symbiotic relationships with other aquatic insects, terrestrial insects, and some plants.

They are distributed, and in most cases found in high abundance globally. They are found in a wide variety of habitats, from the glaciated areas of the tallest mountains, to the deepest bodies of freshwater.

=== Habitats ===
==== Aquatic habitats ====
Larval stages of the Chironomidae can be found in almost any aquatic or semiaquatic habitat. In fact, in many freshwater aquatic habitats, especially polluted ones, chironomids are often one of the most abundant insects found. Aquatic habitats can be marine or freshwater, the latter including treeholes, bromeliads, interstitial and benthic zones, as well as man-made sewage and artificial containers. They can also be found inhabiting plant held waters, intertidal zones, interstitial zones. Many species of chironomids are found residing in sediments or benthic levels of water bodies, where dissolved oxygen is very low.

A number of chironomid species inhabit marine habitats. Midges of the genus Clunio are found in the intertidal zone, where they have adjusted their entire life cycle to the rhythm of the tides. This made the species Clunio marinus an important model species for research in the field of chronobiology.

==== Terrestrial habitats ====
Chironomid larvae can also be found in some terrestrial habitats. Many species that are terrestrial are found living in soil as a dominant part of soil fauna community, particularly in wet soil habitats but also in agricultural land and in early stages of succession. Some species will use humic soils to develop as larvae on land; usually using decaying vegetation or sometimes living vegetation to survive. One genus of chironomids, Camptocladius, are known to develop as larvae in cow dung. There are also some that are known to burrow deep into soil in cases of temporary aquatic habitats or droughts.

Chironomid adults are predominately found in terrestrial habitats.

=== Roles in the ecosystem ===
Chironomidae have variable feeding ecology: most species feed on algae and other small soil organisms they can filtrate. Some commensal species feed off of algae on their hosts, which also provides the benefit of protection and additional mobility; particularly when their chosen host site is another predatory larval species. Some species are parasitic, and pierce the integument of its host in order to feed off of its hemolymph.

Larvae and pupae are important food items for fish, such as trout, banded killifish, and sticklebacks, and for many other aquatic organisms as well such as newts. Many aquatic insects, such as various predatory hemipterans in the families Nepidae, Notonectidae, and Corixidae eat Chironomidae in their aquatic phases. Additionally, predatory water beetles in families such as the Dytiscidae and Hydrophilidae have been found to feed on larval chironomids. Flying midges in their adult stage are eaten by fish and insectivorous birds, such as swallows and martins. They are also thought to be an especially important food source for tufted duck chicks during their first few days of life. They also are preyed on by bats and flying predatory insects, such as Odonata and dance flies.

In the aquatic life cycle of midges, organic matter in the waste water is consumed and transferred as adult midges to the land or air as food to the terrestrial predators. In the process, contaminated water transforms into lesser polluted water. They form an important fraction of the macro zoobenthos of most freshwater ecosystems. They are highly tolerant to low dissolved oxygen levels and changing salinity levels, both of which are often resultant from human pollution. Thus, The Chironomidae are important as indicator organisms, i.e., the presence, absence, or quantities of various species in a body of water can indicate whether pollutants are present.

Also, their fossils are widely used by palaeolimnologists and paleoentomologists as potential indicators of past environmental changes, including past climatic variability. Although, the results of these tests are often controversial, and there are disagreements as to how beneficial they can be in the paleoentomology world.

==== Symbiotic relationships ====
A significant portion of the Chironomidae larvae have been reported in commensal relationships with other organisms in their ecosystems. Although little is known about host choice and preference, it's been reported widely that Ephemeroptera are typically their most commonly reported host sites.

Larval Chironomids often partake in commensal behaviors as a result of limited mobility and defensive morphology. Although they do not have appendages designed for swimming, and most free-living movement is done through undulations, Chironomids do possess strong appendages that help them grasp onto a host.

===== Commensalism in chironomids =====
Larval Commensal chironomids have been known to compete for space on the host. This competition happens on an interspecies level, but also with other commensal and or phoretic organisms. Chironomids have been reported to compete with ciliated protozoan Ephemera danica, although this competition has resulted in niche-partitioning on the hosts body. These species do not compete for food, but rather for ideal spaces on the host. In these competitive relationships, Chironomids generally choose larger host body sizes, while the protozoans might prefer smaller hosts. In host sites that contained both species, potential micro niches were observed, as these organisms were observed to deliberately space themselves out. Generally however, it seemed that chironomids beat out the protozoan in abundance on a host.

A number of biotic and abiotic factors may affect host choice in chironomids. There is evidence that this choice is pressured by hydrological factors. A higher number of chironomids associating phoretically with Ephemeroptera during a rainy season. In the dry season, host choices seemed to diversify a great deal, with many hosts only being found in a dry season. It has been suggested that this may be due to an influx of vegetative debris and detritus that characterizes a rainy season in aquatic environments, which would cause an increase in associated taxa, such as Ephemeroptera.

There have been reports of phoretic associates with predatory aquatic insects as well in chironomids. These relationships, although uncommon, represent more steady hosts for chironomids if they are accessible. Phoresy on a predatory host has been suggested to mean a more mobile, and protective host, resulting in an easier development stage for the commensal organism.

== Stress tolerance ==
=== Heat tolerance ===
Some chironomids can withstand high temperatures without the need to desiccate and pause development. A Japanese species of chironomid, Tokunagayusurika akasumi, have adapted to aestivation in sediments below their habitats in the event of high temperatures.

=== Cold tolerance ===
Chironomids as a whole are a relatively cold-tolerant group. Overwintering of species is found in almost all its subfamilies. Most of them cocoon during their pupation to overwinter, but this is not found in all individuals within a species. It is hypothesized that this overwintering difference in behavior occurs when temperature are at their lowest, and perhaps has to do with the presence of ice cover in the habitat.

Chironomids from Lake Ontario were found to produce an antifreeze protein. Antifreeze protein expression likely helps the adults with frost resistance during early spring.

=== Pollution tolerance ===
The Chironomidae are important as indicator organisms, i.e., the presence, absence, or quantities of various species in a body of water can indicate whether pollutants are present. Also, their fossils are widely used by palaeolimnologists as indicators of past environmental changes, including past climatic variability. Contemporary specimens are used by forensic entomologists as medico-legal markers for the postmortem interval assessment.

=== Anhydrobiosis and other stresses ===
Anhydrobiosis is the ability of an organism to survive in the dry state. Anhydrobiotic larvae of the African chironomid Polypedilum vanderplanki can withstand prolonged complete desiccation (reviewed by Cornette and Kikawada). These larvae can also withstand other external stresses including ionizing radiation. The effects of anhydrobiosis, gamma ray and heavy-ion irradiation on the nuclear DNA and gene expression of these larvae were studied by Gusev et al. They found that larval DNA becomes severely fragmented both upon anhydrobiosis and irradiation, and that these breaks are later repaired during rehydration or upon recovery from irradiation. An analysis of gene expression and antioxidant activity suggested the importance of removal of reactive oxygen species as well as the removal of DNA damages by repair enzymes. Expression of genes encoding DNA repair enzymes increased upon entering anhydrobiosis or upon exposure to radiation, and these increases indicated that when DNA damages occurred, they were subsequently repaired. In particular, expression of the Rad51 gene was substantially up-regulated following irradiation and during rehydration. The Rad51 protein plays a key role in homologous recombination, a process required for the accurate repair of DNA double-strand breaks.

Many species of chironomids have adapted high tolerances to desiccation, particularly those inhabiting temporary aquatic habitats or places where droughts frequently occur. Anhydrobiosis, which is the resultant of complete desiccation, is the loss of most or all water in the body. Although its more common in terrestrial species, tolerance for drought within the Chironomidae is similar in both terrestrial and aquatic species. A species from Africa was found with extreme tolerance to desiccation. This species was able to completely desiccate, and within 48 hours movement was found after rehydration. This same species is able to withstand this pause in development for an extended period of time, with records of it surviving up to 17 years completely dehydrated.

== Chironomids and humans ==
Chironomids can be both beneficial and a nuisance to humans. They are a historically important food source for some communities in Africa.

Some Chironomid larvae thrive in very heavily polluted habitats. These habitats are often man-made, and result in little to no biodiversity, which implies no natural predators present to keep midge populations at natural levels. These conditions often worsen emergence events, which also take place near human-dominated habitats.

== Subfamilies and genera ==
The family is divided into 11 subfamilies: Aphroteniinae, Buchonomyiinae, Chilenomyiinae, Chironominae, Diamesinae, Orthocladiinae, Podonominae, Prodiamesinae, Tanypodinae, Telmatogetoninae, and Usambaromyiinae. Most species belong to Chironominae, Orthocladiinae, and Tanypodinae. Diamesinae, Podonominae, Prodiamesinae, and Telmatogetoninae are medium-sized subfamilies with tens to hundreds of species. The remaining four subfamilies have fewer than five species each.

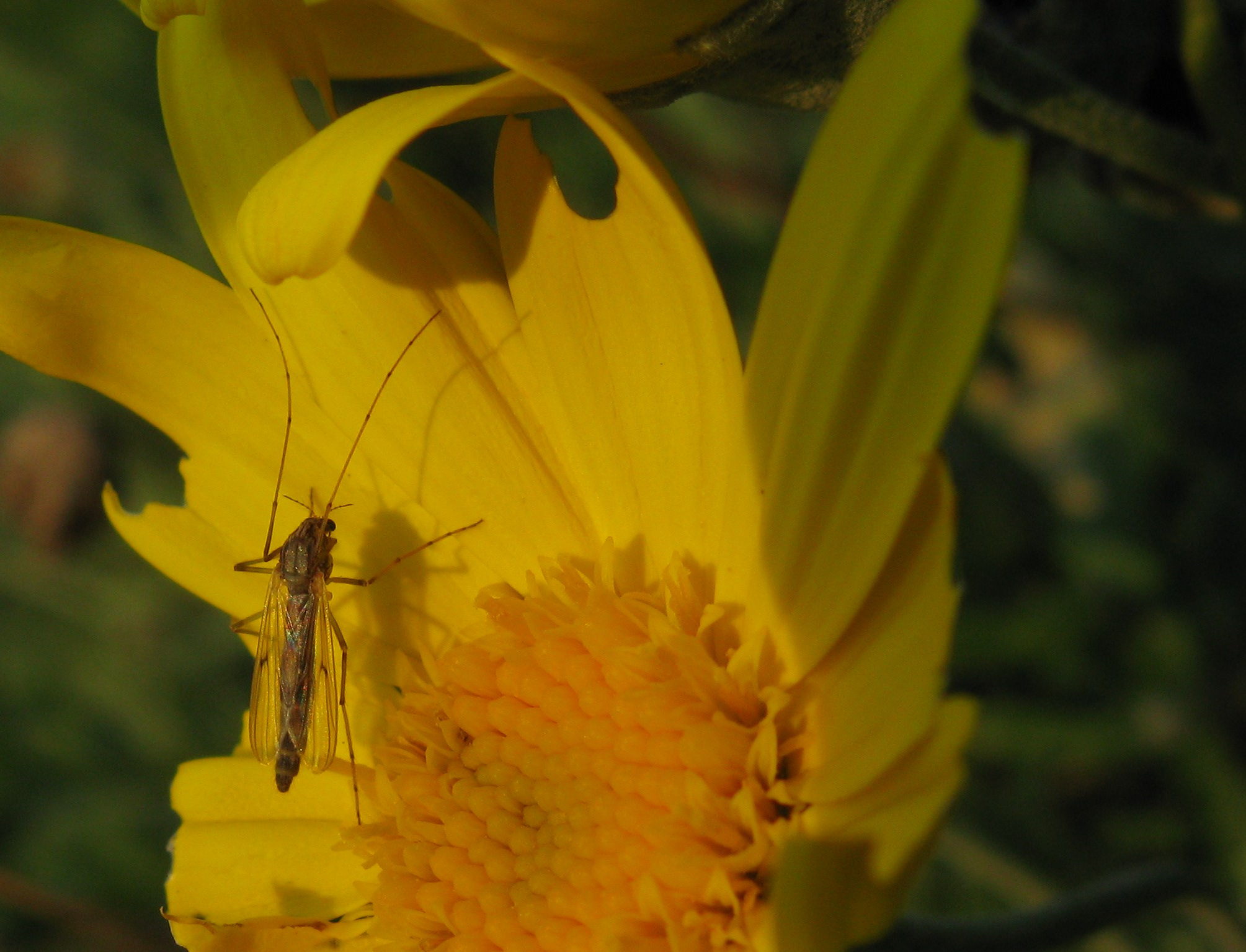
Chironomidae sp. female on flower of Euryops sp. Damage caused by beetles in family Meloidae.

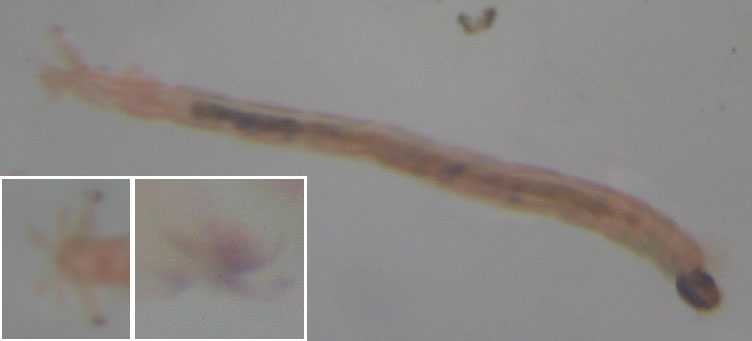
Chironomidae larva, about 1 cm long, the head is right: The magnified tail details are from other images of the same animal.

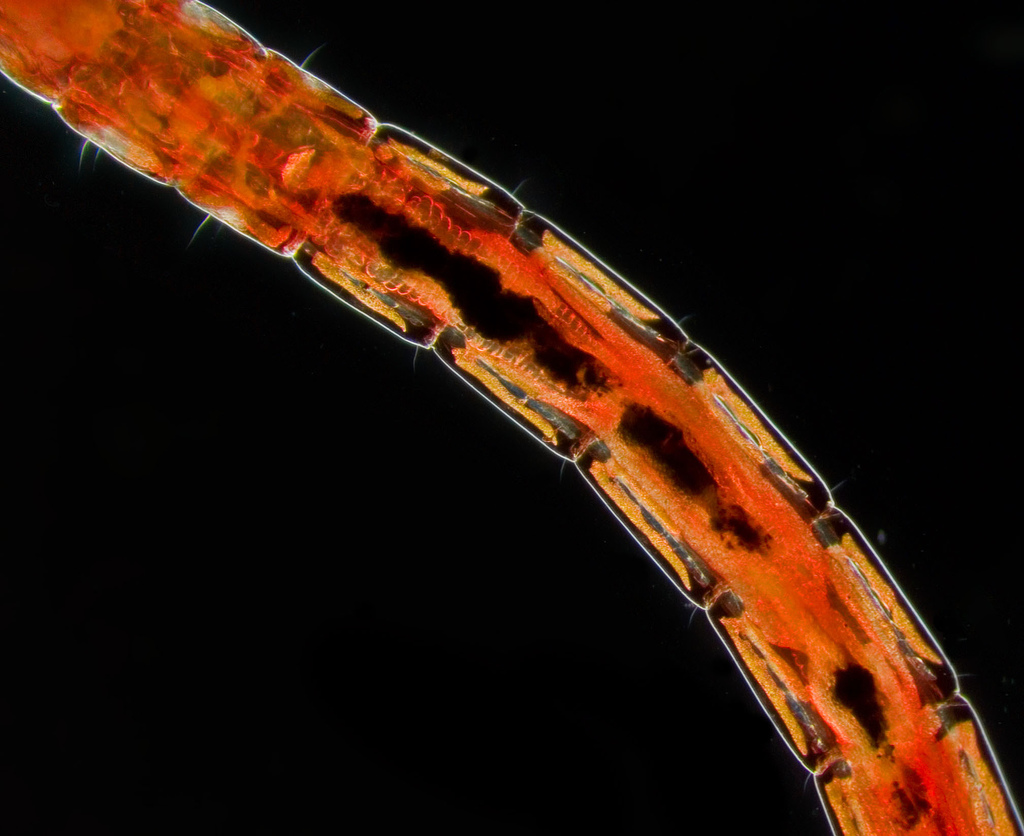
Chironomid "bloodworm" larva showing the characteristic red color, about 40× magnification: The head is towards the upper left, just out of view.

- Aagaardia Sæther, 2000
- Abiskomyia Edwards, 1937
- Ablabesmyia Johannsen, 1905
- Acalcarella
- Acamptocladius Brundin, 1956
- Acricotopus Kieffer, 1921
- Aedokritus
- Aenne
- Afrochlus
- Afrozavrelia Harrison, 2004
- Allocladius
- Allometriocnemus
- Allotrissocladius
- Alotanypus Roback, 1971
- Amblycladius
- Amnihayesomyia
- Amphismittia
- Anaphrotenia
- Anatopynia Johannsen, 1905
- Ancylocladius
- Andamanus
- Antillocladius Sæther, 1981
- Anuncotendipes
- Apedilum Townes, 1945
- Aphrotenia
- Aphroteniella
- Apometriocnemus Sæther, 1984
- Apsectrotanypus Fittkau, 1962
- Archaeochlus
- Arctodiamesa Makarchenko, 1983
- Arctopelopia Fittkau, 1962
- Arctosmittia
- Asachironomus
- Asclerina
- Asheum Sublette & Sublette, 1983
- Australopelopia
- Austrobrillia
- Austrochlus
- Austrocladius
- Axarus Roback 1980
- Baeoctenus
- Baeotendipes Kieffer, 1913
- Bavarismittia
- Beardius Reiss & Sublette, 1985
- Beckidia Sæther 1979
- Belgica
- Bernhardia
- Bethbilbeckia
- Biwatendipes
- Boreochlus Edwards, 1938
- Boreoheptagyia Brundin 1966
- Boreosmittia
- Botryocladius
- Brillia Kieffer, 1913
- Brundiniella
- Brunieria
- Bryophaenocladius Thienemann, 1934
- Buchonomyia Fittkau, 1955
- Caladomyia
- Camposimyia
- Camptocladius van der Wulp, 1874
- Cantopelopia
- Carbochironomus Reiss & Kirschbaum 1990
- Cardiocladius Kieffer, 1912
- Chaetocladius Kieffer, 1911
- Chasmatonotus
- Chernovskiia Sæther 1977
- Chilenomyia
- Chirocladius
- Chironomidae
- Chironominae
- Chironomini
- Chironomus Meigen, 1803
- Chrysopelopia
- Cladopelma Kieffer, 1921
- Cladotanytarsus Kieffer, 1921
- Clinotanypus Kieffer, 1913
- Clunio Haliday, 1855
- Coelopynia
- Coelotanypus
- Coffmania
- Collartomyia
- Colosmittia
- Compteromesa Sæther 1981
- Compterosmittia
- Conchapelopia Fittkau, 1957
- Conochironomus
- Constempellina Brundin, 1947
- Corynocera Zetterstedt, 1838
- Corynoneura Winnertz, 1846
- Corynoneurella Brundin, 1949
- Corytibacladius
- Cricotopus van der Wulp, 1874
- Cryptochironomus Kieffer, 1918
- Cryptotendipes Lenz, 1941
- Cyphomella Sæther 1977
- Dactylocladius
- Daitoyusurika
- Demeijerea Kruseman, 1933
- Demicryptochironomus Lenz, 1941
- Denopelopia
- Derotanypus
- Diamesa Meigen in Gistl, 1835
- Diamesinae
- Dicrotendipes Kieffer, 1913
- Diplocladius Kieffer, 1908
- Diplosmittia
- Djalmabatista Fittkau, 1968
- Doithrix
- Doloplastus
- Doncricotopus
- Dratnalia
- Echinocladius
- Edwardsidia
- Einfeldia Kieffer, 1924
- Endochironomus Kieffer, 1918
- Endotribelos
- Epoicocladius Sulc & ZavÍel, 1924
- Eretmoptera
- Eukiefferiella Thienemann, 1926
- Eurycnemus van der Wulp, 1874
- Euryhapsis Oliver, 1981
- Eusmittia
- Fissimentum
- Fittkauimyia
- Fleuria
- Freemaniella
- Friederia
- Georthocladius Strenzke, 1941
- Gillotia Kieffer, 1921
- Glushkovella
- Glyptotendipes Kieffer, 1913
- Goeldichironomus
- Graceus Goetghebuer, 1928
- Gravatamberus
- Gressittius
- Guassutanypus
- Guttipelopia Fittkau, 1962
- Gymnometriocnemus Goetghebeur, 1932
- Gynnidocladius
- Gynocladius Mendes, Sæther & Andrade-Morraye, 2005
- Hahayusurika
- Halirytus
- Halocladius Hirvenoja, 1973
- Hanochironomus
- Hanocladius
- Harnischia Kieffer, 1921
- Harrisius
- Harrisonina
- Hayesomyia Murray & Fittkau, 1985
- Heleniella Gouin, 1943
- Helopelopia Roback, 1971
- Henrardia
- Heptagyia
- Heterotanytarsus Spärck, 1923
- Heterotrissocladius Spärck, 1923
- Hevelius
- Himatendipes
- Hirosimayusurika
- Hudsonimyia Roback, 1979
- Hydrobaenus
- Hydrosmittia
- Hyporhygma
- Ichthyocladius Fittkau, 1974
- Ikiprimus
- Ikisecundus
- Imparipecten
- Indoaxarus
- Indocladius
- Ionthosmittia
- Irisobrillia
- Kaluginia
- Kamelopelopia
- Kaniwhaniwhanus
- Kiefferophyes
- Kiefferulus Goetghebuer, 1922
- Knepperia
- Kloosia Kruseman 1933
- Krenopelopia Fittkau, 1962
- Krenopsectra
- Krenosmittia Thienemann & Krüger, 1939
- Kribiobius
- Kribiocosmus
- Kribiodosis
- Kribiopelma
- Kribiothauma
- Kribioxenus
- Kurobebrillia
- Kuschelius
- Labrundinia Fittkau, 1962
- Lappodiamesa Serra-Tosio, 1968
- Lappokiefferiella
- Lapposmittia
- Larsia Fittkau, 1962
- Lasiodiamesa Kieffer, 1924
- Laurotanypus
- Lauterborniella Thienemann & Bause, 1913
- Lepidopelopia
- Lepidopodus
- Lerheimia
- Limaya
- Limnophyes Eaton, 1875
- Lindebergia
- Linevitshia
- Lipiniella Shilova 1961
- Lipurometriocnemus
- Lithotanytarsus
- Litocladius Andersen, Mendes & Sæther 2004
- Ljungneria
- Lobodiamesa
- Lobomyia
- Lobosmittia
- Lopescladius
- Lunditendipes
- Lyrocladius Mendes & Andersen, 2008
- Macropelopia Thienemann, 1916
- Macropelopini
- Manoa
- Maoridiamesa
- Mapucheptagyia
- Maryella
- Mecaorus
- Megacentron
- Mesocricotopus
- Mesosmittia Brundin, 1956
- Metriocnemus van der Wulp, 1874
- Microchironomus Kieffer, 1918
- Micropsectra Kieffer, 1909
- Microtendipes Kieffer, 1915
- Microzetia
- Molleriella
- Mongolchironomus
- Mongolcladius
- Mongolyusurika
- Monodiamesa Kieffer, 1922
- Monopelopia Fittkau, 1962
- Murraycladius
- Nakataia
- Nandeva
- Nanocladius Kieffer, 1913
- Naonella
- Nasuticladius
- Natarsia Fittkau, 1962
- Neelamia
- Neobrillia
- Neopodonomus
- Neostempellina
- Neozavrelia Goetghebuer, 1941
- Nesiocladius
- Nilodorum
- Nilodosis
- Nilotanypus Kieffer, 1923
- Nilothauma Kieffer, 1921
- Nimbocera
- Notocladius
- Odontomesa Pagast, 1947
- Okayamayusurika
- Okinawayusurika
- Olecryptotendipes Zorina, 2007
- Oleia
- Oliveridia Sæther, 1980
- Omisus Townes, 1945
- Onconeura
- Ophryophorus
- Oreadomyia
- Orthocladiinae
- Orthocladius van der Wulp, 1874
- Oryctochlus
- Oukuriella
- Pagastia Oliver, 1959
- Pagastiella Brundin, 1949
- Paraboreochlus Thienemann, 1939
- Parachaetocladius
- Parachironomus Lenz, 1921
- Paracladius Hirvenoja, 1973
- Paracladopelma Harnisch, 1923
- Paracricotopus Thienemann & Harnisch, 1932
- Parakiefferiella Thienemann, 1936
- Paralauterborniella Lenz, 1941
- Paralimnophyes Brundin, 1956
- Paramerina Fittkau, 1962
- Parametriocnemus Goetghebuer, 1932
- Pamirocesa
- Paraborniella
- Parachironominae
- Paradoxocladius
- Paraheptagyia
- Paranilothauma
- Parapentaneura
- Paraphaenocladius Thienemann, 1924
- Paraphrotenia
- Parapsectra Reiss, 1969
- Parapsectrocladius
- Parasmittia
- Paratanytarsus Thienemann & Bause, 1913
- Paratendipes Kieffer, 1911
- Paratrichocladius Thienemann, 1942
- Paratrissocladius ZavÍel, 1937
- Parochlus Enderlein, 1912
- Parorthocladius Thienemann, 1935
- Parvitergum
- Paucispinigera
- Pelomus
- Pentaneura
- Pentaneurella
- Pentaneurini
- Pentapedilum
- Petalocladius
- Phaenopsectra Kieffer, 1921
- Physoneura
- Pirara
- Platysmittia Sæther, 1982
- Plhudsonia
- Podochlus
- Podonomopsis
- Podonomus
- Polypedilum Kieffer, 1912
- Pontomyia
- Potthastia Kieffer, 1922
- Prochironomus
- Procladiini
- Procladius Skuse, 1889
- Prodiamesa Kieffer, 1906
- Propsilocerus
- Prosmittia
- Protanypus Kieffer, 1906
- Psectrocladius Kieffer, 1906
- Psectrotanypus Kieffer, 1909
- Pseudobrillia
- Pseudochironomus Malloch, 1915
- Pseudodiamesa Goetghebuer, 1939
- Pseudohydrobaenus
- Pseudokiefferiella Zavrel, 1941
- Pseudorthocladius Goetghebuer, 1932
- Pseudosmittia Goetghebuer, 1932
- Psilochironomus
- Psilometriocnemus Sæther, 1969
- Pterosis
- Qiniella
- Reissmesa
- Rheochlus
- Rheocricotopus Brundin, 1956
- Rheomus
- Rheomyia
- Rheopelopia Fittkau, 1962
- Rheosmittia Brundin, 1956
- Rheotanytarsus Thienemann & Bause, 1913
- Rhinocladius
- Riethia
- Robackia Sæther, 1977
- Saetheria Jackson, 1977
- Saetheriella Halvorsen, 1982
- Saetherocladius
- Saetherocryptus
- Saetheromyia
- Saetherops
- Sasayusurika
- Schineriella Murray & Fittkau, 1988
- Semiocladius
- Setukoyusurika
- Seppia
- Sergentia Kieffer, 1922
- Shangomyia
- Shilovia
- Skusella
- Skutzia
- Smittia Holmgren, 1869
- Stackelbergina
- Stelechomyia
- Stempellina Thienemann & Bause, 1913
- Stempellinella Brundin, 1947
- Stenochironomus Kieffer, 1919
- Stictochironomus Kieffer, 1919
- Stictocladius
- Stictotendipes
- Stilocladius Rossaro, 1979
- Sublettea
- Sublettiella
- Sumatendipes
- Symbiocladius Kieffer, 1925
- Sympotthastia Pagast, 1947
- Syndiamesa Kieffer, 1918
- Synendotendipes Grodhaus, 1987
- Synorthocladius Thienemann, 1935
- Tanypodinae
- Tanypus Meigen, 1803
- Tanytarsini
- Tanytarsus van der Wulp, 1874
- Tavastia
- Telmatogeton Schiner, 1866
- Telmatopelopia Fittkau, 1962
- Telopelopia
- Tempisquitoneura
- Tethymyia
- Thalassomya Schiner, 1856
- Thalassosmittia Strenzke & Remmert, 1957
- Thienemannia Kieffer, 1909
- Thienemanniella Kieffer, 1911
- Thienemannimyia Fittkau, 1957
- Thienemanniola
- Tobachironomus
- Tokunagaia Sæther, 1973
- Tokunagayusurika
- Tokyobrillia
- Tosayusurika
- Townsia
- Toyamayusurika
- Tribelos Townes, 1945
- Trichochilus
- Trichosmittia
- Trichotanypus Kieffer, 1906
- Trissocladius Kieffer, 1908
- Trissopelopia Kieffer, 1923
- Trondia
- Tsudayusurika
- Tusimayusurika
- Tvetenia Kieffer, 1922
- Unniella Sæther, 1982
- Usambaromyia Andersen & Sæther, 1994
- Virgatanytarsus Pinder, 1982
- Vivacricotopus
- Wirthiella
- Xenochironomus Kieffer, 1921
- Xenopelopia Fittkau, 1962
- Xestochironomus
- Xestotendipes
- Xiaomyia
- Xylotopus
- Yaeprimus
- Yaequartus
- Yaequintus
- Yaesecundus
- Yaetanytarsus
- Yaetertius
- Yama
- Zalutschia Lipina, 1939
- Zavrelia Kieffer, 1913
- Zavreliella Kieffer, 1920
- Zavrelimyia Fittkau, 1962
- Zelandochlus
- Zhouomyia
- Zuluchironomus
