= Jean-Jacques Kieffer =

French naturalist and entomologist (1857–1925)

Jean-Jacques Kieffer (1857 in Guinkirchen – 1925 in Bitche) was a French naturalist and entomologist who specialised in the study of parasitic insects. Educated as a priest, Kieffer taught natural science in Bitche, Lorraine while working on the description and classification of insects. His work and publications later became a predominant source of description and classification for entomologists in the early 20th century, in particular with regard to parasitoid wasps, midges, and mosquitos.

He collaborated with the English entomologist Peter Cameron.

Kieffer received an honorary Doctor honoris causa degree from the University of Strasbourg in 1904.

== Selected publications ==
- Monographie des Cécidomyides d’Europe et d’Algérie. Annales de la Société Entomologique de France 69: 181–472, pl. 15–44. 1900
- Synopsis des Zoocécidies d’Europe. Annales de la Société Entomologique de France 70: 233–579. 1901
- Beschreibung neuer Proctotrypiden und Evaniiden. Arkiv for Zoologi 1: 525–562. 1904
- Description de nouveaux diapriides et belytides d'Europe. Annales de la Société scientifique de Bruxelles, 1909
- Hymenoptera. Fam. Scelionidae. Addenda et corrigenda. Genera Insectorum 80: 61–112. 1910
- Hymenoptera, Proctotrupoidea. Transactions of the Linnean Society of London, Zoology 15: 45–80. 1912
- Proctotrupidae, Cynipidae et Evaniidae. Voyage de Ch. Alluaud et R. Jeannel en Afrique Orientale (1911–1912). Résultats scientifiques. Hyménoptères 1: 1–35. 1913
- Proctotrypidae (3e partie). Pages 305–448 in André, E. Species des Hyménoptères d'Europe et d'Algérie. Vol. 11. 1914
- Neue Scelioniden aus den Philippinen-Inseln. Brotéria 14: 58–187. 1916
- Diapriidae. Das Tierreich. Vol. 44. Walter de Gruyter & Co., Berlin. 1916 627 pp.
- Scelionidae. Das Tierreich. Vol. 48. Walter de Gruyter & Co., Berlin. 1926 885pp.

== Collection ==
Kieffer did not possess a collection. Instead he worked on museum material especially on that of the Muséum national d'histoire naturelle which contains his types of the Hymenoptera families Proctotrupidae, Platygasteridae, Ceraphronidae, Diapriidae, Scelionidae, Bethylidae, Dryinidae and Embolemidae. Some other material is held by the Lycée Technique et Lycée Professionnel Henri Nominé in Sarreguemines.

== Honours ==
A number of insect genera and species have been named for him, e.g.

- Kiefferia, a genus of gall midges
- Kiefferulus, a genus of chironomids
- Kiefferomyia, a genus of biting midges (now included in Kieffer's own genus Schizohelea)

== See also ==
- Category:Taxa named by Jean-Jacques Kieffer
