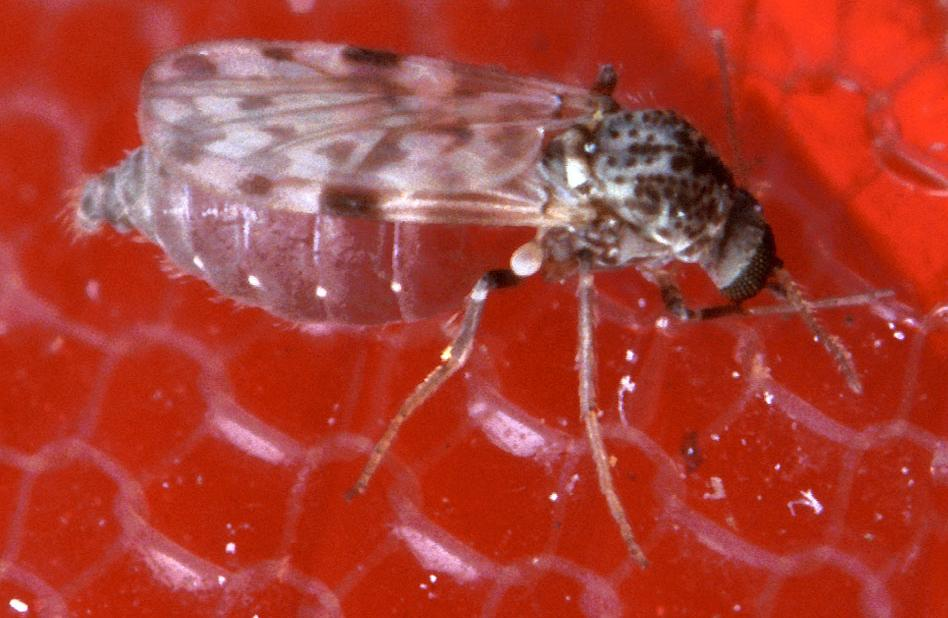
- A biting midge feeding on blood through an artificial membrane for insect rearing

Scientific classification
- Kingdom: Animalia
- Phylum: Arthropoda
- Clade: Pancrustacea
- Class: Insecta
- Order: Diptera
- Suborder: Nematocera

Families
- See text

= Midge =

Midges

Common name for several species of flies

A midge is any small fly, including species in several families of non-mosquito nematoceran Diptera. Midges are found (seasonally or otherwise) on practically every land area outside permanently arid deserts and the frigid zones. Some midges, such as many Phlebotominae (sand fly) and Simuliidae (black fly), are vectors of various diseases. Many others play useful roles as prey for insectivores, such as various frogs and swallows. Others are important as detritivores, and form part of various nutrient cycles. The habits of midges vary greatly from species to species, though within any given family midges commonly have similar ecological roles.

Examples of families that include species of midges include:

- Blephariceridae, net-winged midges
- Cecidomyiidae, gall midges
- Ceratopogonidae, biting midges (also known as no-see-ums or punkies in North America and sandflies in Australia)
- Chaoboridae, phantom midges
- Chironomidae, non-biting midges (also known as muckleheads, muffleheads or lake flies in the Great Lakes region of North America)
- Deuterophlebiidae, mountain midges
- Dixidae, meniscus midges
- Scatopsidae, dung midges
- Thaumaleidae, solitary midges

== Examples ==
The Ceratopogonidae (biting midges) include serious blood-sucking pests, feeding on humans and other mammals. Some of them spread diseases that plague livestock, such as blue tongue and African horse sickness. Other species are at least partly nectar feeders, and some even suck bodily fluids of other insects.

Many midges are known for having symbiotic relationships with many other organisms. These can be commensal, parasitic or mutualistic relationships. Many of the commensal relationships are found within the family Chironomidae.

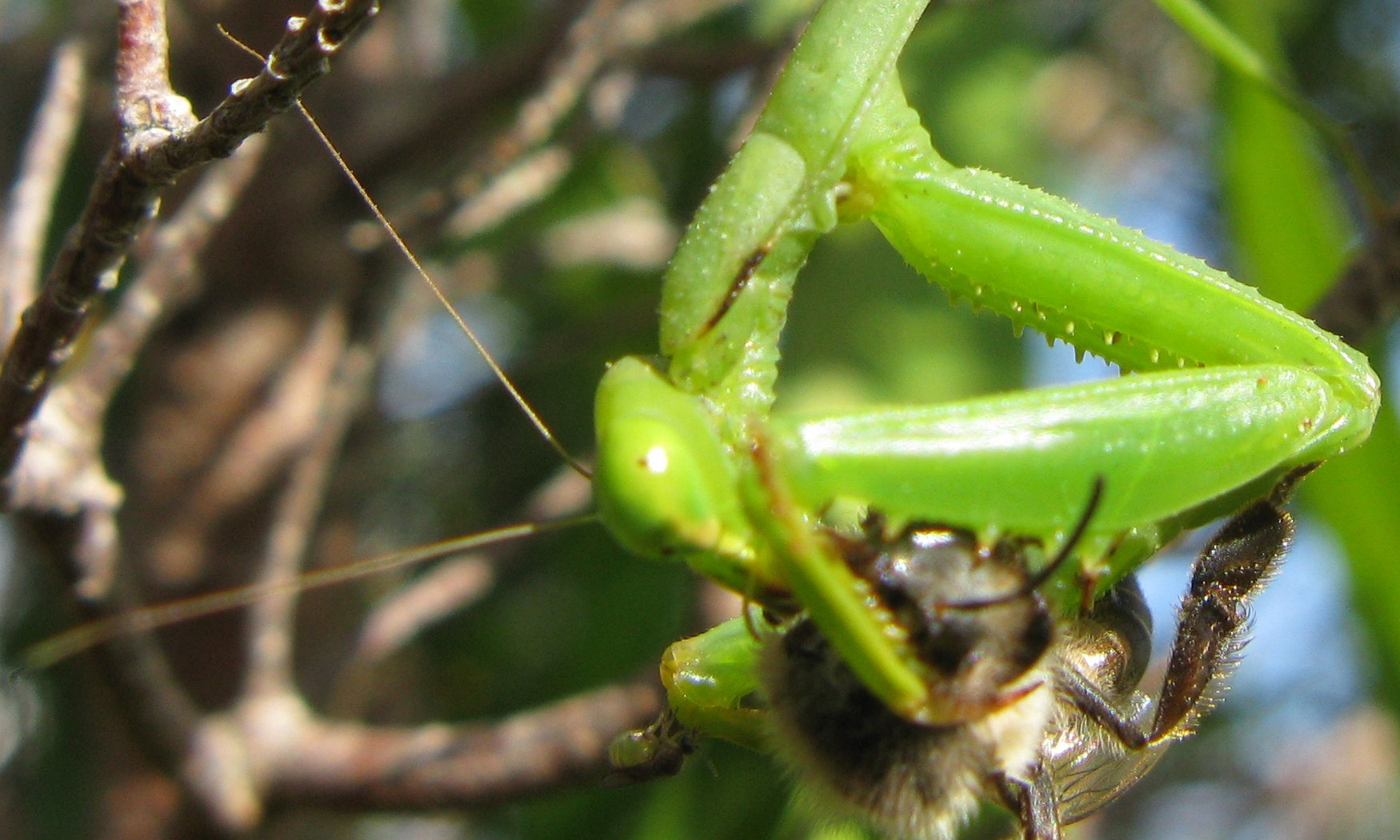
A midge of the family Ceratopogonidae (lower middle - a branch is its background) sitting on a mantis sucking its hemolymph whilst the mantis feeds on a bee

Other ceratopogonid midges are major pollinators of Theobroma cacao (cocoa tree). Having natural pollinators has beneficial effects in both agricultural and biological products because it increases crop yield and also density of predators of the midges (still beneficial to all parties).

The term "midge" is a vague term that refers to a large and diverse group of organisms. Although many are known as "bloodsuckers," there are many different roles that they play in their respective ecosystems. There is, for example, no objective basis for excluding the Psychodidae from the list, and some of them (or midge-like taxa commonly included in the family, such as Phlebotomus) are blood-sucking pests and disease vectors.

Most midges, apart from the gall midges (Cecidomyiidae), are aquatic during the larval stage. Some Cecidomyiidae (e.g., the Hessian fly) are considered significant pests of some plant species. The larvae of some Chironomidae contain hemoglobin and are sometimes referred to as bloodworms.

Non-biting midge flies are commonly considered a minor nuisance around bodies of water. In May 2025, a large emergence of midges caused mayhem at the World Exposition in Osaka, Japan.

== See also ==
- Highland midge
