= Ole A. Sæther =

Norwegian entomologist (1936–2013)

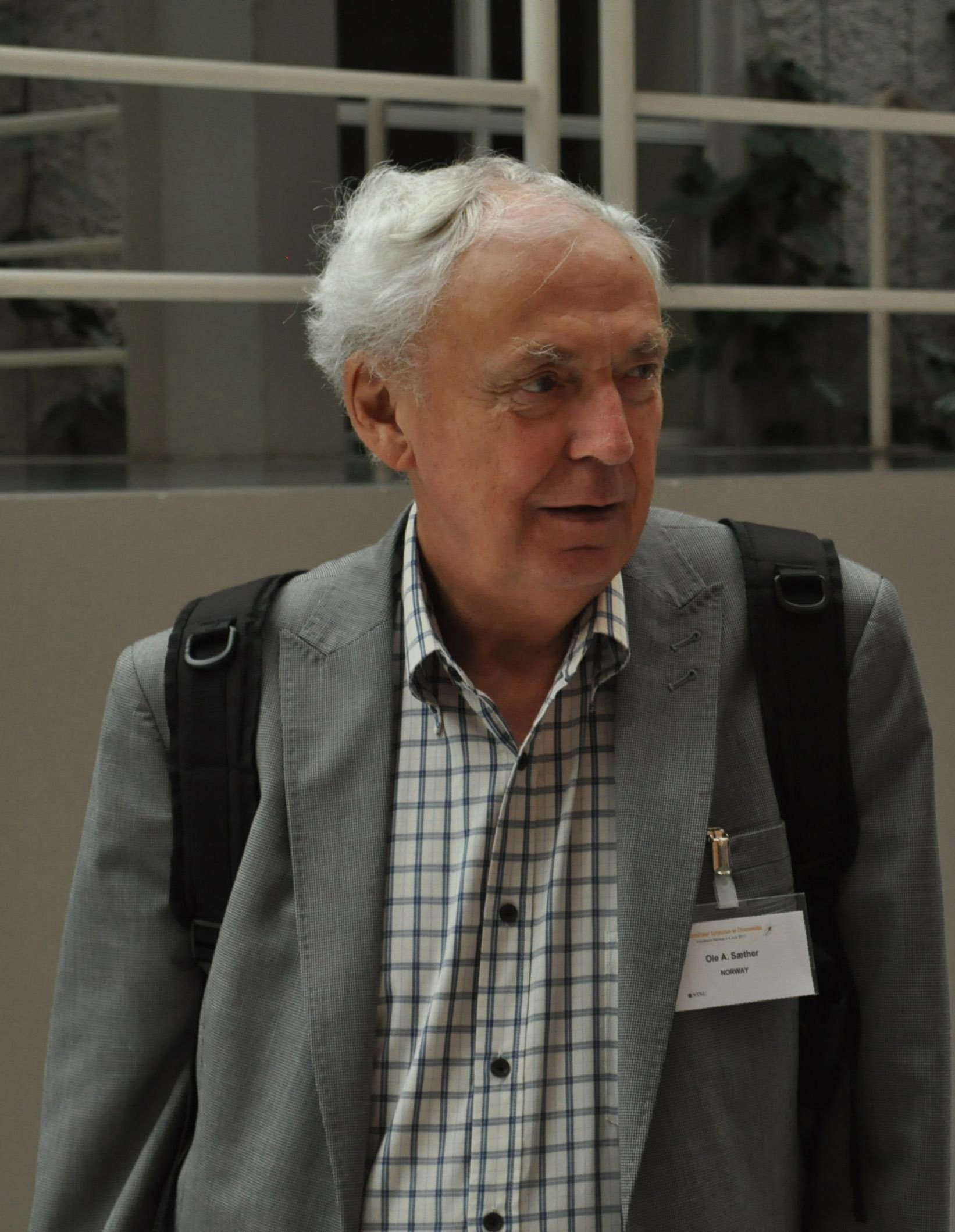
- Ole Anton Sæther at the International Symposium on Chironomidae at Trondheim
- Born: December 9, 1936; Kristiansand, Norway
- Died: January 8, 2013 (aged 76)
- Education: University of Oslo
- Known for: Chironomidae
- Scientific career
- Fields: Entomology

Ole Anton Sæther (9 December 1936 – 8 January 2013) was a Norwegian entomologist.

He was scientific assistant and university lecturer at Department of Limnology, University of Oslo, from 1960 to 1966; research scientist at Freshwater Institute, Winnipeg, Manitoba, Canada from 1966 to 1977; and professor of systematic zoology in the Museum of Zoology at the University of Bergen from 1977 to his retirement in 2006. He specialized in aquatic Diptera, especially Chironomidae and Chaoboridae. He penned about 265 academic publications (more than 5,500 pages); authored or co-authored 3 subfamilies, 42 genera or subgenera, and more than 300 species; and was a member of the editorial board of the journals Aquatic Insects and Acta Zoologicae Academiae Scientarum Hungaricae. He received an honorary degree at Nankai University in 2000 and was an honorary member of the Finnish Entomological Society.

The festschrift Contributions to the Systematics and Ecology of Aquatic Diptera: A Tribute to Ole A. Sæther was released for his seventieth birthday. The genera Saetheria, Saetheriella, Saetheromyia, Saetherocladius, Saetherocryptus, Saetherops, Oleia, and Olecryptotendipes and the species Diamesa saetheri, Protanypus saetheri, Propsilocerus saetheri, Hydrobaenus saetheri, Limnophyes saetheri, Nanocladius saetheri, Orthocladius saetheri, Tanytarsus saetheri, and Tokunagaia oleantoni have been named after him. His contributions to the database Fauna Europaea, as an expert on Chironomidae, were much appreciated.

He resided at Ulriksdal 1 in Bergen.
