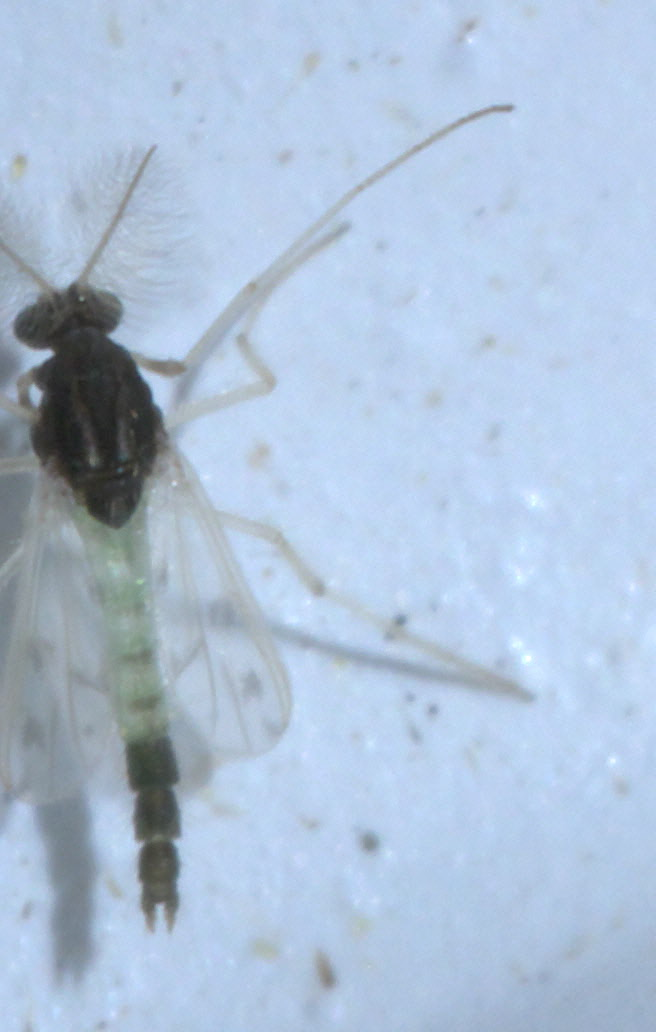

Scientific classification
- Kingdom: Animalia
- Phylum: Arthropoda
- Class: Insecta
- Order: Diptera
- Family: Chironomidae
- Tribe: Chironomini
- Genus: Apedilum
- Species: A. elachistus

Binomial name
- Apedilum elachistus Townes, 1945

= Apedilum elachistus =

Species of fly

Apedilum elachistus is a species of midge in the family Chironomidae.

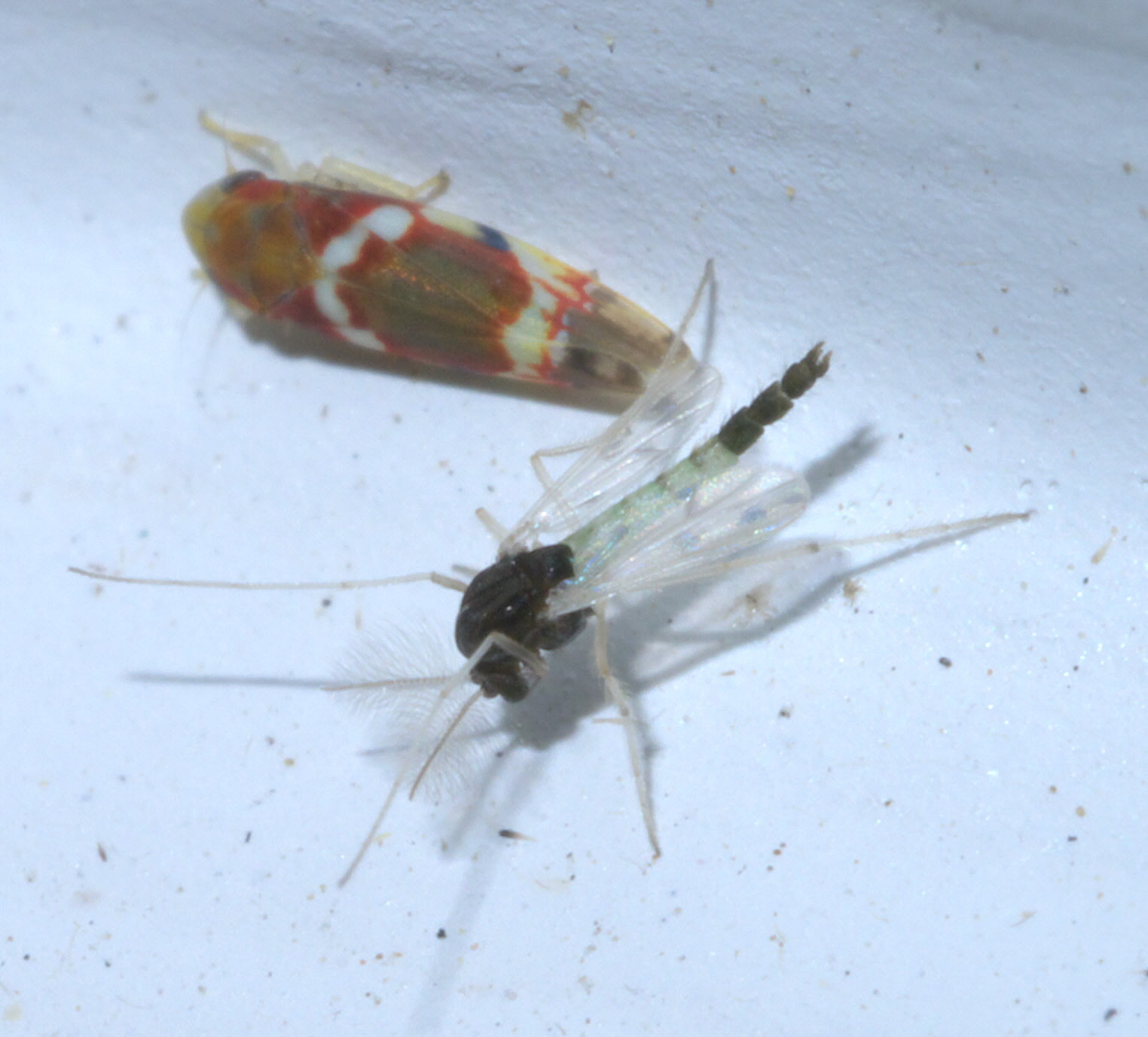
