= Einfeldia pagana =

Scientific classification
- Domain: Eukaryota
- Kingdom: Animalia
- Phylum: Arthropoda
- Class: Insecta
- Order: Diptera
- Family: Chironomidae
- Tribe: Chironomini
- Genus: Einfeldia
- Species: E. pagana

Binomial name
- Einfeldia pagana (Meigen, 1838)

Synonyms
- Einfeldia synchrona Oliver, 1971

Species of fly

Einfeldia pagana is a species of midge in the family Chironomidae. It is found in Europe and Asia.
