= Fleuria =

Scientific classification
- Kingdom: Animalia
- Phylum: Arthropoda
- Clade: Pancrustacea
- Class: Insecta
- Order: Diptera
- Family: Chironomidae
- Tribe: Chironomini
- Genus: Fleuria; Kieffer, 1924

Genus of flies

Fleuria is a genus of non-biting midges in the subfamily Chironominae of the bloodworm family Chironomidae. There is a single species in this genus, Fleuria lacustris, found in Europe and Asia.

== Species ==
- F. lacustris Kieffer, 1924
