= Robackia =

Scientific classification
- Kingdom: Animalia
- Phylum: Arthropoda
- Clade: Pancrustacea
- Class: Insecta
- Order: Diptera
- Family: Chironomidae
- Subfamily: Chironominae
- Tribe: Chironomini
- Genus: Robackia; Saether, 1977

Synonyms
- Rabackia Saether, 1977

Genus of non-biting midges

Robackia is a genus of non-biting midges in the family Chironomidae. There are about seven described species in Robackia, found in North America, Europe, and southern Asia.

== Species ==
These seven species belong to the genus Robackia:

- Robackia aculeata Zorina, 2003
- Robackia aequilongia Mukherjee & Hazra, 2022
- Robackia claviger (Townes, 1945)
- Robackia demeijerei (Kruseman, 1933)
- Robackia lukini Orel, 2018
- Robackia parallela Yan & Wang, 2006
- Robackia pilicauda Saether, 1977
