= Carbochironomus =

Scientific classification
- Domain: Eukaryota
- Kingdom: Animalia
- Phylum: Arthropoda
- Class: Insecta
- Order: Diptera
- Family: Chironomidae
- Subfamily: Chironominae
- Tribe: Chironomini
- Genus: Carbochironomus; Reiss & Kirschbaum, 1990
- Species: C. improvisus

Binomial name
- Carbochironomus improvisus Reiss & Kirschbaum, 1990

Genus of non-biting midges

Carbochironomus is a genus of nonbiting midges in the family Chironomidae, discovered in Germany. It has a single species, Carbochironomus improvisus.

This genus is sometimes considered a member of the tribe Chironomini, and is sometimes unplaced to subfamily.
