= Cyphomella =

Scientific classification
- Kingdom: Animalia
- Phylum: Arthropoda
- Clade: Pancrustacea
- Class: Insecta
- Order: Diptera
- Family: Chironomidae
- Subfamily: Chironominae
- Tribe: Chironomini
- Genus: Cyphomella; Saether 1977

Genus of non-biting midges

Cyphomella is a genus of non-biting midges in the family Chironomidae. There are about six described species in Cyphomella.

== Species ==
These six species belong to the genus Cyphomella:

- Cyphomella argentea (Townes, 1945)
- Cyphomella ariadnae (Shilova, 2001)
- Cyphomella camelus (Kieffer, 1925)
- Cyphomella cornea Saether, 1977
- Cyphomella gibbera Saether, 1977
- Cyphomella grisa (Malloch, 1915)
