= Asheum =

Scientific classification
- Domain: Eukaryota
- Kingdom: Animalia
- Phylum: Arthropoda
- Class: Insecta
- Order: Diptera
- Family: Chironomidae
- Tribe: Chironomini
- Genus: Asheum; Sublette & Sublette, 1983

Type species
- Pedionomus beckae Sublette, 1964

Synonyms
- Pedionomus Sublette, 1964

Genus of flies

Asheum is a genus of European non-biting midges in the subfamily Chironominae of the bloodworm family Chironomidae. It was originally named Pedionomus by James E. Sublette in 1964; this name was discovered by Patrick Ashe to be preoccupied by Pedionomus Gould, 1840, so it was renamed to Asheum by both James E. and Mary S. Sublette in 1983, naming it after Patrick Ashe. Asheum is sometimes considered to be a subgenus of Polypedilum.

== Species ==
- A. beckae (Sublette, 1964)
- A. curticaudatum (Rempel, 1939)
