= Beardius =

Scientific classification
- Kingdom: Animalia
- Phylum: Arthropoda
- Clade: Pancrustacea
- Class: Insecta
- Order: Diptera
- Family: Chironomidae
- Subfamily: Chironominae
- Tribe: Chironomini
- Genus: Beardius; Reiss & Sublette, 1985

Type species
- Beardius parcus Reiss & Sublette, 1985

Genus of non-biting midges

Beardius is a genus of non-biting midges in the family Chironomidae. There are about 12 described species in Beardius, found in North, Central, and South America. It is named after the late Melvin Beard, a student at Eastern New Mexico University.

== Species ==
These 12 species belong to the genus Beardius:

- Beardius aciculatus Andersen & Saether, 1996
- Beardius breviculus Reiss & Sublette, 1985
- Beardius cristhinae Trivinho-Strixino & Siqueira, 2007
- Beardius lingulatus Andersen & Saether, 1996
- Beardius longissimum (Mendes & Andersen, 2009)
- Beardius parcus Reiss & Sublette, 1985
- Beardius phytophilus Trivinho-Strixino & Strixino, 2000
- Beardius reissi Jacobsen, 2000
- Beardius roquei Trivinho-Strixino & Siqueira, 2007
- Beardius triangulatus Andersen & Saether, 1996
- Beardius truncatus Reiss & Sublette, 1985
- Beardius xylophilus Trivinho-Strixino & Strixino, 2000
