= Afrozavrelia =

Zavrelia

Scientific classification
- Kingdom: Animalia
- Phylum: Arthropoda
- Class: Insecta
- Order: Diptera
- Family: Chironomidae
- Subfamily: Orthocladiinae
- Genus: Afrozavrelia; Harrison, 2004

Type species
- Afrozavrelia kribiensis (Kieffer, 1923)

Genus of flies

Afrozavrelia is a genus of European non-biting midges in the subfamily Chironominae of the bloodworm family Chironomidae that are closely related to Zavrelia.

== Species ==
- A. kribiensis (Kieffer, 1923)
