= Omisus pica =

Scientific classification
- Kingdom: Animalia
- Phylum: Arthropoda
- Class: Insecta
- Order: Diptera
- Family: Chironomidae
- Tribe: Chironomini
- Genus: Omisus
- Species: O. pica

Binomial name
- Omisus pica Townes, 1945

Species of fly

Omisus pica is a species of midge in the family Chironomidae.
