= Gillotia (fly) =

Scientific classification
- Kingdom: Animalia
- Phylum: Arthropoda
- Clade: Pancrustacea
- Class: Insecta
- Order: Diptera
- Family: Chironomidae
- Subfamily: Chironominae
- Tribe: Chironomini
- Genus: Gillotia; Kieffer, 1921

Genus of non-biting midges

Gillotia is a genus of non-biting midges in the family Chironomidae. There are two described species in Gillotia.

== Species ==
These species belong to the genus Gillotia:

- Gillotia alboviridis (Malloch, 1915)
- Gillotia trifida (Freeman, 1957)
