= Kloosia =

Scientific classification
- Kingdom: Animalia
- Phylum: Arthropoda
- Clade: Pancrustacea
- Class: Insecta
- Order: Diptera
- Family: Chironomidae
- Subfamily: Chironominae
- Tribe: Chironomini
- Genus: Kloosia; Kruseman, 1933

Synonyms
- Oschia Saether, 1983; Oshia Kruseman, 1933

Genus of non-biting midges

Kloosia is a genus of European non-biting midges in the subfamily Chironominae of the bloodworm family Chironomidae.

== Species ==
These eight species belong to the genus Kloosia:

- Kloosia africana Reiss, 1988
- Kloosia dorsenna (Saether, 1983)
- Kloosia incurva Mukherjee & Hazra, 2023
- Kloosia inflata Mukherjee & Hazra, 2023
- Kloosia koreana Reiss, 1988
- Kloosia pusillus (Linnaeus, 1767)
- Kloosia triangulata Andersen, Mendes & Sanz-laParra, 2023
- Kloosia weii Yan & Wang, 2012
