= Pagastiella =

Scientific classification
- Kingdom: Animalia
- Phylum: Arthropoda
- Clade: Pancrustacea
- Class: Insecta
- Order: Diptera
- Family: Chironomidae
- Subfamily: Chironominae
- Tribe: Chironomini
- Genus: Pagastiella; Brundin, 1949

Synonyms
- Curvaria Chernovsky, 1938

Genus of non-biting midges

Pagastiella is a genus of non-biting midges in the family Chironomidae. There are at least two described species in Pagastiella.

== Species ==
These two species belong to the genus Pagastiella:

- Pagastiella orophila (Edwards, 1929)
- Pagastiella ostansa (Webb, 1969)
