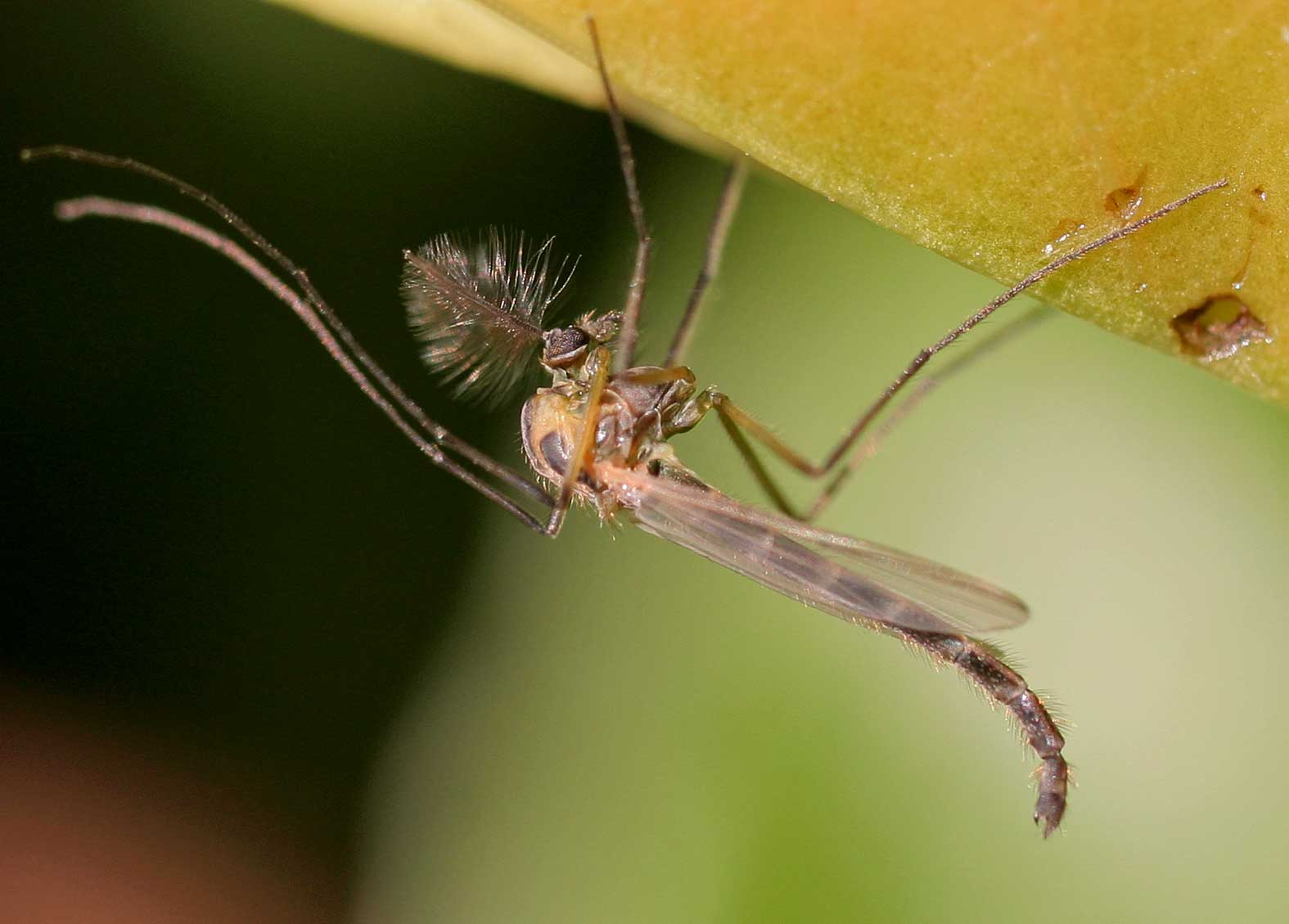
- Chironomus plumosus Adult male

Scientific classification
- Kingdom: Animalia
- Phylum: Arthropoda
- Clade: Pancrustacea
- Class: Insecta
- Order: Diptera
- Family: Chironomidae
- Subfamily: Chironominae
- Tribe: Chironomini; Macquart, 1838

Synonyms
- Campontiinae Townes, 1945; Camptoniinae Cole, 1970; Cheironomii Acloque, 1897; Chirnomides Coates, 1842; Chironimidae Pearse, 1946; Chironomida Heer, 1849; Chironomidae Erichson, 1841; Chironomidae Williston, 1907; Chironomides Macquart, 1838; Chironomidi Bigot, 1888; Chironomii Zetterstedt, 1837; Chironomina Rondani, 1856; Chironominae Rondani, 1840; Chironomitae Desmarest, 1860; Chironomoidae Agassiz, 1846; Chironomydi Bigot, 1891; Chironomyidae Wesché, 1908; Cryptochironomiinae Lenz, 1921; Hironomidae; Nepaliariae Kieffer, 1911; Protobibionidae Rohdendorf, 1946; Stempellini Shilova, 1976; Tendipadidae Rohdendorf, 1951

= Chironomini =

Tribe of non-biting midges

Chironomini is a tribe of non-biting midges in the family Chironomidae. There are more than 80 genera and 2,300 described species in Chironomini, found worldwide.

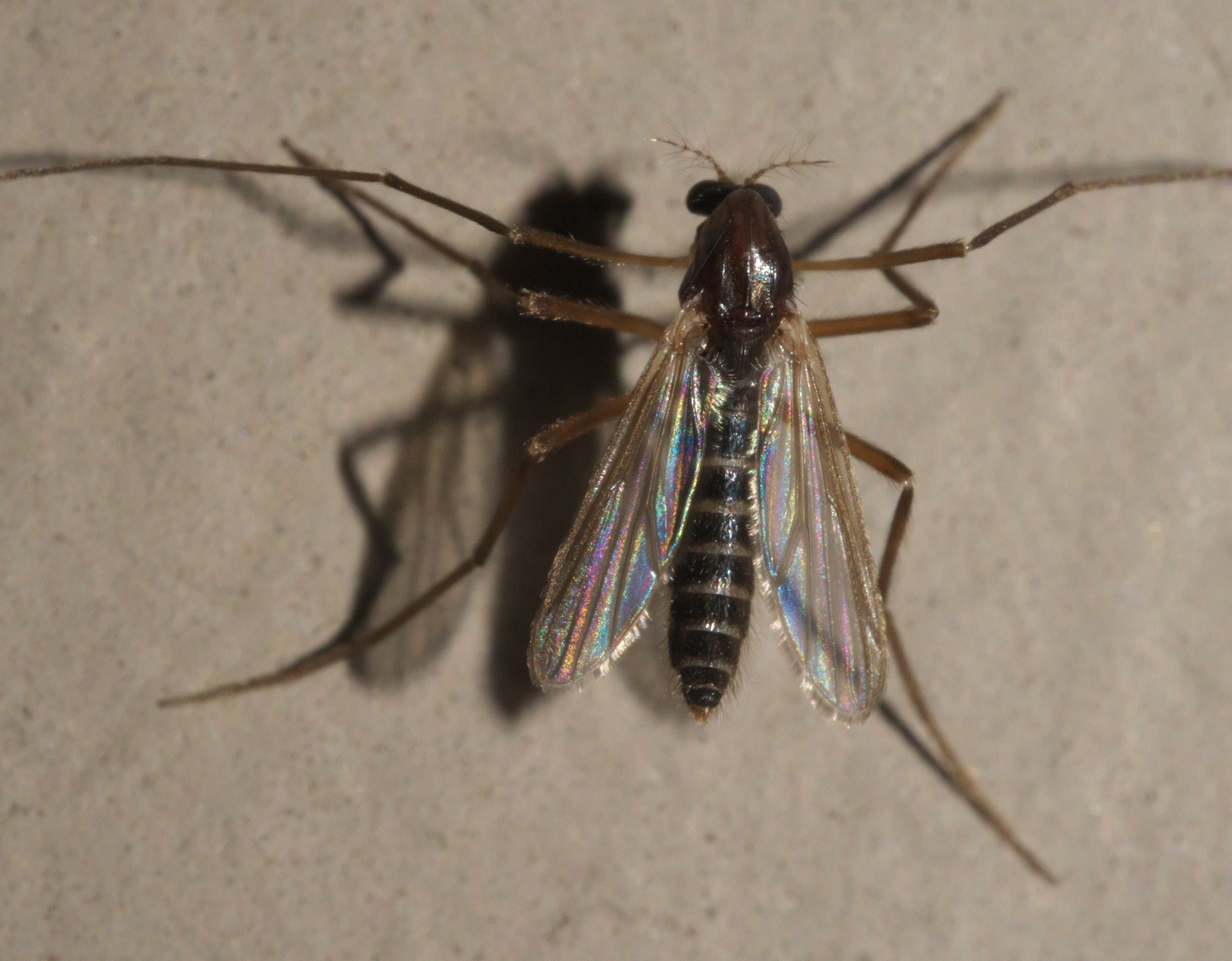
Tribelos, Florida

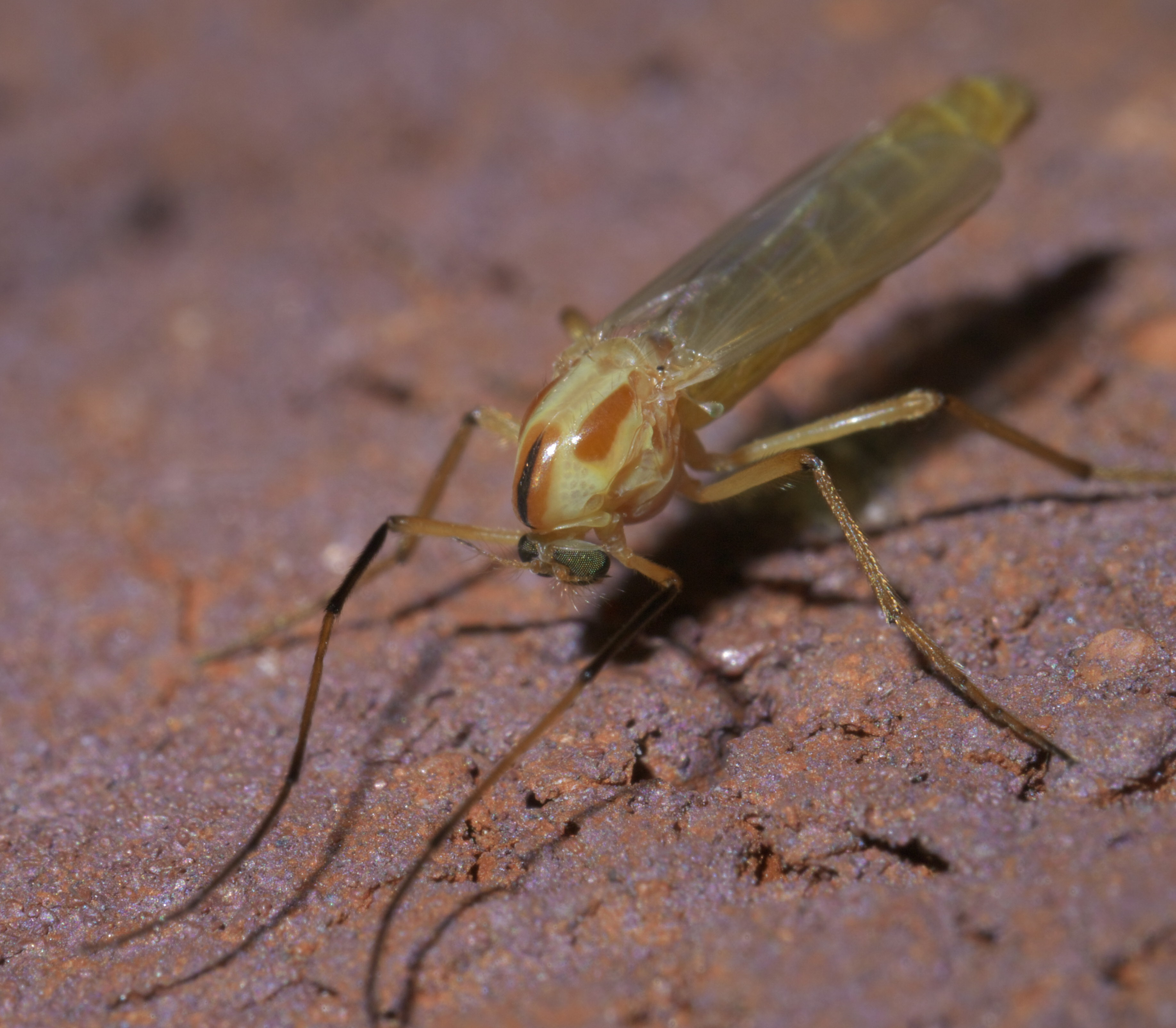
Axarus, Oklahoma

== Genera ==
These 88 genera belong to the tribe Chironomini:

- Acalcarella Shilova, 1955
- Ainuyusurika Sasa & Shirasaka, 1988
- Apedilum Townes, 1945
- Asachironomus Kikuchi & Sasa, 1990
- Asheum Sublette & Sublette, 1983
- Axarus Roback, 1980
- Baeotendipes Kieffer, 1913
- Beardius Reiss & Sublette, 1985
- Beckidia Saether, 1979
- Brunieria Kieffer, 1921
- Camptochironomus Meigen, 1803
- Chernovskiia Saether, 1977
- Chironomus Meigen, 1803
- Cladopelma Kieffer, 1921
- Conochironomus Freeman, 1961
- Cryptochironomus Kieffer, 1918
- Cryptotendipes Beck & Beck, 1969
- Cyphomella Saether, 1977
- Demeijerea Kruseman, 1933
- Demicryptochironomus Lenz, 1941
- Dicrotendipes Kieffer, 1913
- Einfeldia Kieffer, 1924
- Endochironomus Kieffer, 1918
- Endotribelos Grodhaus, 1987
- Fleuria Kieffer, 1924
- Gillotia Kieffer, 1921
- Glyptotendipes Kieffer, 1913
- Goeldichironomus Fittkau, 1965
- Graceus Goetghebuer, 1928
- Hanochironomus Ree, 1992
- Harnischia Kieffer, 1921
- Harrisius Freeman, 1959
- Henrardia Goetghebuer, 1936
- Hyporhygma Reiss, 1982
- Imparipecten Freeman, 1961
- Indoaxarus Maheshwari & Maheswari, 2001
- Kiefferulus Goetghebuer, 1922
- Kloosia Kruseman, 1933
- Kribiocosmus Kieffer, 1921
- Kribiodorum Kieffer, 1921
- Kribiodosis Kieffer, 1921
- Kribiothauma Kieffer, 1921
- Kribioxenus Kieffer, 1921
- Lauterborniella Thienemann & Bause, 1913
- Lepidopodus Freeman, 1958
- Lipinella Malakhova, 1975
- Lipiniella Shilova, 1961
- Microchironomus Kieffer, 1921
- Microtendipes Kieffer, 1915
- Nandeva Wiedenbrug, Reiss & Fittkau, 1998
- Nilodosis Kieffer, 1921
- Nilothauma Kieffer, 1921
- Nubensia Spies & Dettinger-Klemm, 2015
- Omisus Townes, 1945
- Ophryophorus Freeman, 1959
- Oukuriella Epler, 1986
- Pagastiella Brundin, 1949
- Paraborniella Freeman, 1961
- Parachironomus Lenz
- Paracladopelma Harnisch, 1923
- Paralauterborniella Lenz, 1941
- Paranilothauma Soponis, 1987
- Paraskusella Cranston, 2018
- Paratendipes Kieffer, 1911
- Parvitergum Freeman, 1961
- Paucispinigera Freeman, 1959
- Pentapedilum Kieffer, 1913
- Phaenopsectra Kieffer, 1921
- Polypedilum Kieffer, 1913
- Rheomus Laville & Reiss, 1988
- Robackia Saether, 1977
- Saetheria Jackson, 1977
- Sergentia Kieffer, 1922
- Skusella Freeman, 1961
- Stelechomyia Reiss, 1982
- Stenochironomus Kieffer, 1919
- Stictochironomus Kieffer
- Stictotendipes Lenz, 1937
- Synendotendipes Grodhaus, 1987
- Tobachironomus Kikuchi & Sasa, 1990
- Tribelos Townes, 1945
- Wirthiella Sublette, 1960
- Xenochironomus Kieffer, 1921
- Xestochironomus Sublette & Wirth, 1972
- Yama Sublette & Martin, 1980
- Zavreliella Kieffer, 1920
- Zhouomyia Saether & Wang, 1993
- † Prolipiniella Doitteau & Nel, 2007
