= František Vejdovský =

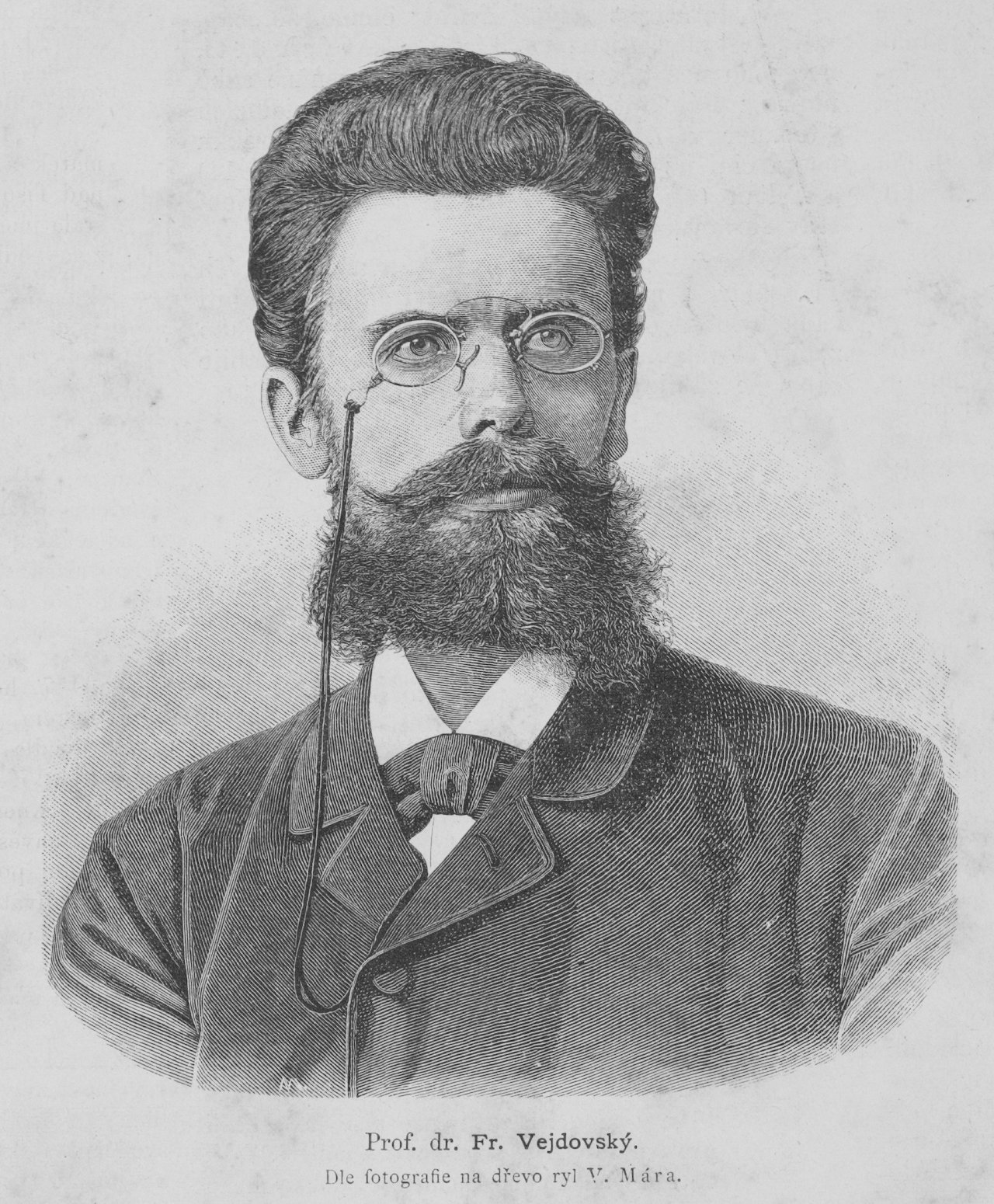
František Vejdovský in 1884, portrait by Václav Mára

František Vejdovský (24 October 1849 in Kouřim – 4 December 1939 in Prague) was a Czech zoologist and served as an influential professor of zoology at Charles University from 1892 to 1921.

Vejdovsky was born in Kouřim and educated at a Latin school and then at Charles University. He received his doctorate in 1876 and habilitated in 1877 while working under Antonin Frič. He worked as a lecturer in zoology at the college of technology and became a professor of zoology, comparative anatomy and embryology in 1892. He served as a professor until his retirement in 1921. In 1886 he discovered the centrosome in animal cells. He studied mainly the invertebrate groups and was an influential teacher. His students included Jiří Janda, Emil Bayer, Bohumil Némec, František Karel Studnička, Karel Sulc, and Jan Zavřel. In 1895 he served as rector magnificus of Charles University. He received an honorary doctorate from the University of Cambridge during the Darwin centenary celebrations in 1909.

In 2007 the International Commission on Zoological Nomenclature ruled that the family "Tubificidae" was a junior synonym of Naididae. He was the first biologist to distinguish between nematodes and gordiids when he named a group to contain the horsehair worms the order Nematomorpha. In 1919, Nathan Cobb proposed that nematodes should be recognized alone as a phylum and Nematomorphs were recognized as their phylum.
