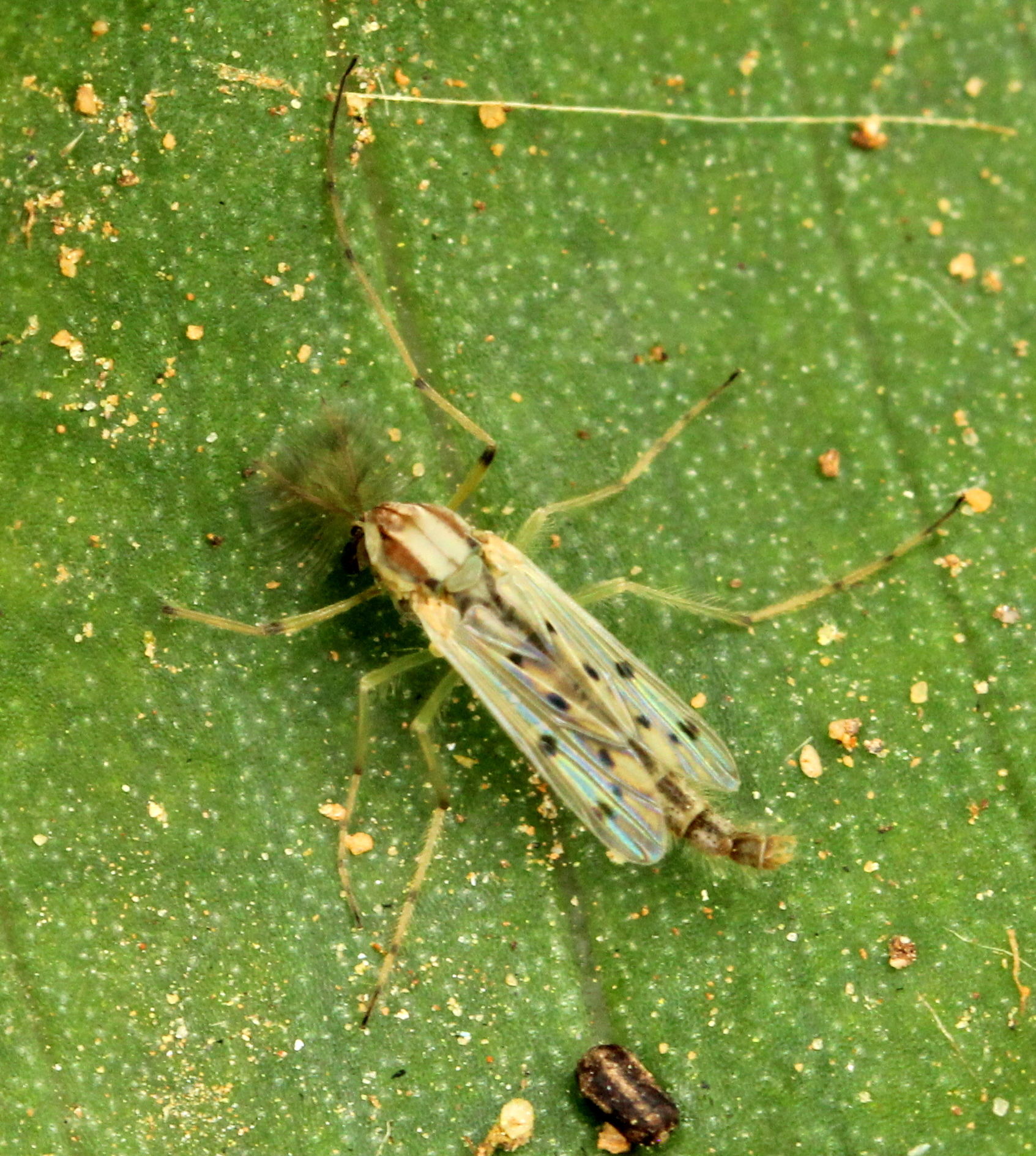
- Dicrotendipes septemmaculatus, South Africa

Scientific classification
- Kingdom: Animalia
- Phylum: Arthropoda
- Clade: Pancrustacea
- Class: Insecta
- Order: Diptera
- Family: Chironomidae
- Subfamily: Chironominae
- Tribe: Chironomini
- Genus: Dicrotendipes; Kieffer, 1913

Synonyms
- Calochironomus Kieffer, 1921; Carteria Kieffer, 1921; Carteronica Strand, 1928; Cladotendipes Lenz, 1937; Kimius Ree, 1981; Limnotendipes Lenz, 1937; Sernowia Aristovskaya, 1935

= Dicrotendipes =

Genus of non-biting midges

Dicrotendipes is a genus of midges in the family Chironomidae. There are more than 100 described species in Dicrotendipes.

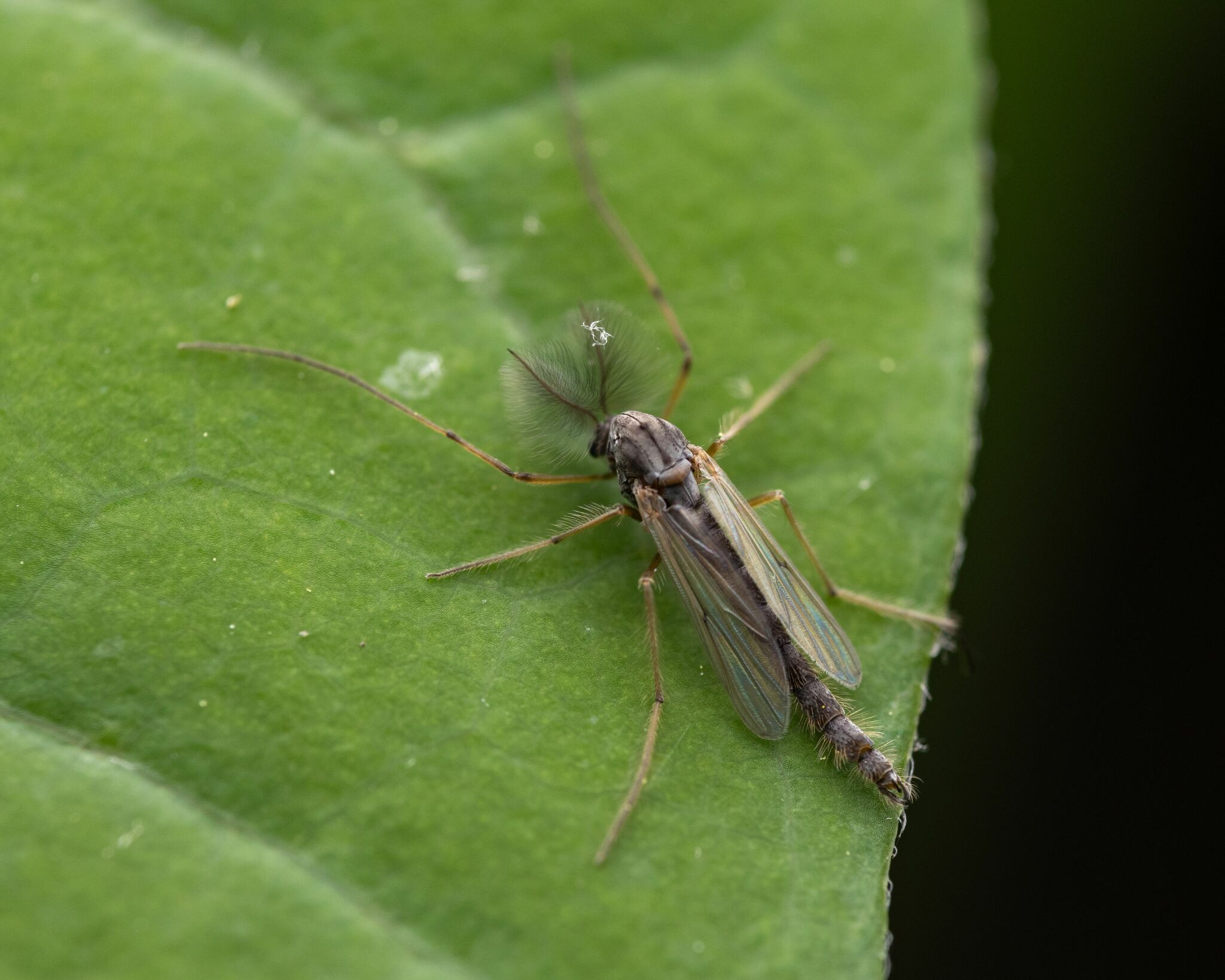
Dicrotendipes fumidus, Maryland

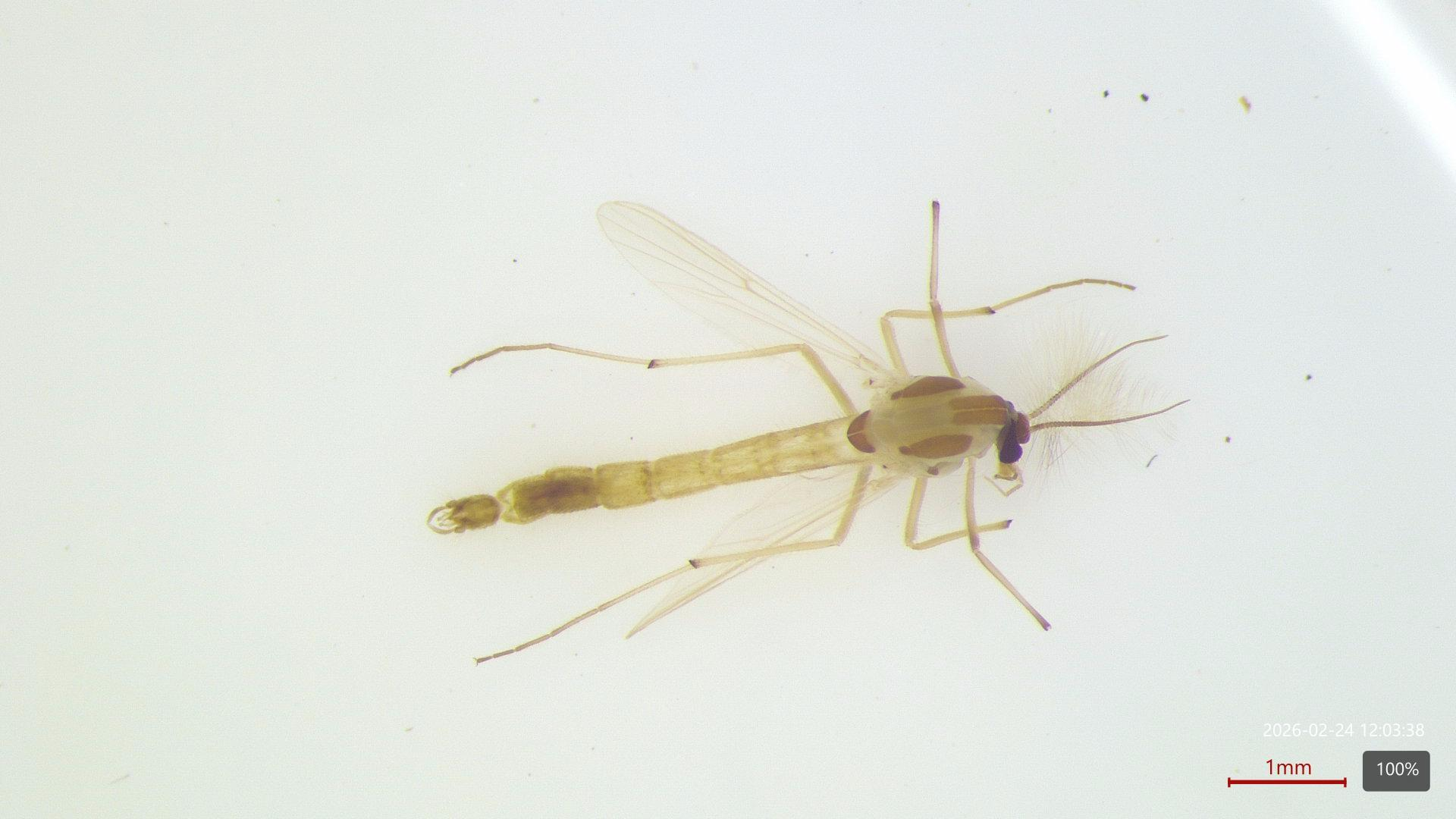
Dicrotendipes modestus, Illinois

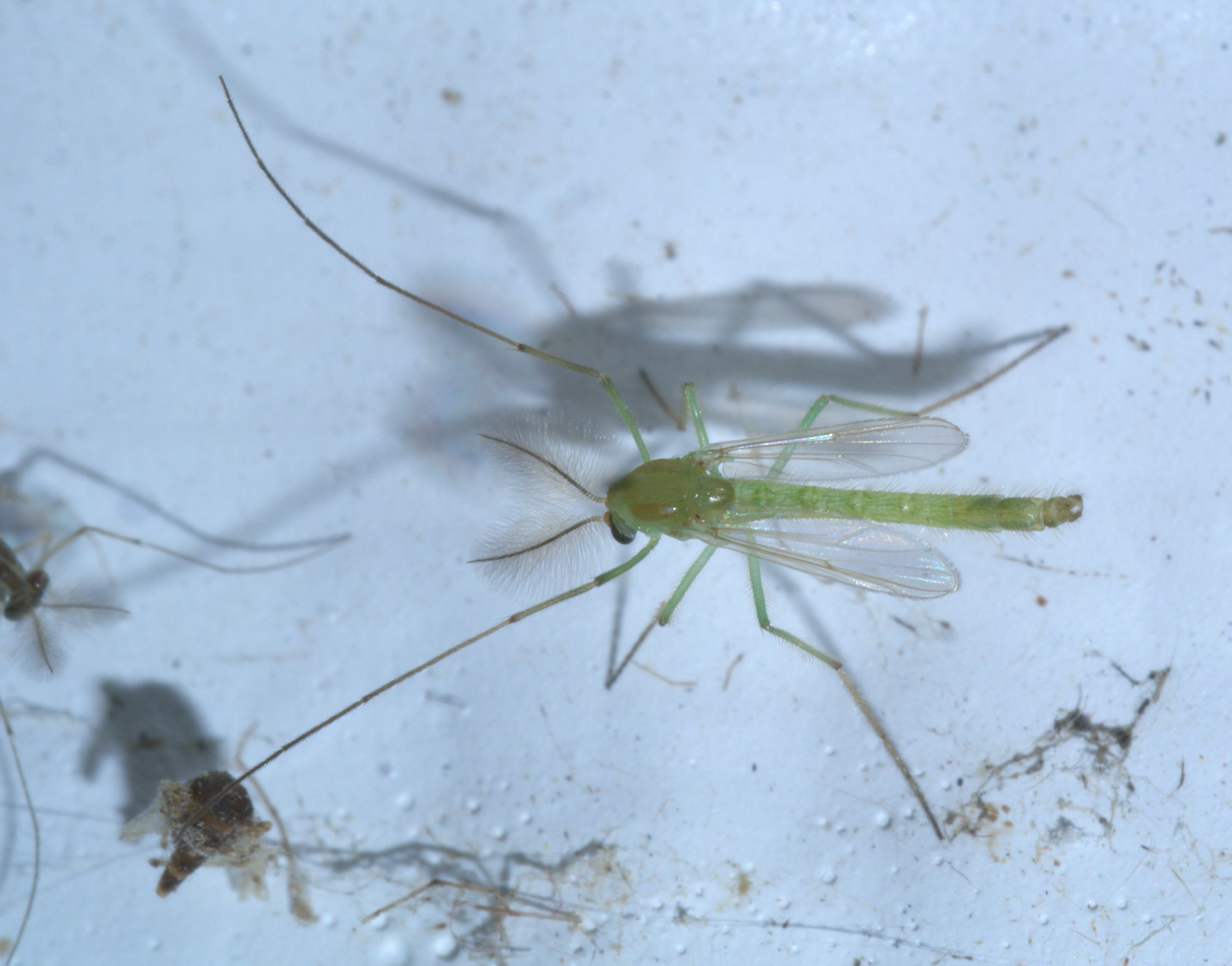
Dicrotendipes, Oklahoma

== Species ==
These 107 species belong to the genus Dicrotendipes:

- Dicrotendipes adnilus Epler, 1987
- Dicrotendipes aethiops (Townes, 1945)
- Dicrotendipes alsinensis (Paggi, 1975)
- Dicrotendipes amazonicus Epler, 1988
- Dicrotendipes arcistylus Guha & Chaudhuri, 1985
- Dicrotendipes balciunasi Epler, 1988
- Dicrotendipes baru Epler, 1996
- Dicrotendipes bilobatus Kieffer, 1917
- Dicrotendipes botaurus (Townes, 1945)
- Dicrotendipes bredoi (Goetghebuer, 1936)
- Dicrotendipes californicus (Johannsen, 1905)
- Dicrotendipes candidibasis (Edwards, 1924)
- Dicrotendipes canitibialis Guha & Chaudhuri, 1985
- Dicrotendipes chambiensis (Goetghebuer, 1936)
- Dicrotendipes clavus Mukherjee, Pal & Hazra, 2019
- Dicrotendipes collarti (Goetghebuer, 1936)
- Dicrotendipes conjunctus (Walker, 1856)
- Dicrotendipes cordatus Kieffer, 1922
- Dicrotendipes crispi (Freeman, 1957)
- Dicrotendipes crypticus Epler, 1987
- Dicrotendipes cumberlandensis Epler, 1988
- Dicrotendipes dasylabidus Epler, 1988
- Dicrotendipes demissus Epler, 1988
- Dicrotendipes dubia (Cândea-Cure, 1973)
- Dicrotendipes ealae (Freeman, 1957)
- Dicrotendipes embalsensis Paggi, 1978
- Dicrotendipes fittkaui Epler, 1988
- Dicrotendipes flexus (Johannsen, 1932)
- Dicrotendipes formosanus Kieffer, 1916
- Dicrotendipes freemani Epler, 1988
- Dicrotendipes frontalis Kieffer, 1916
- Dicrotendipes fumidus (Johannsen, 1905)
- Dicrotendipes fusciforceps (Kieffer, 1921)
- Dicrotendipes fusconotatus (Kieffer, 1922)
- Dicrotendipes gilkai Andersen & Mendes, 2010
- Dicrotendipes hulberti Epler, 2016
- Dicrotendipes inferior (Johannsen, 1932)
- Dicrotendipes inouei Hashimoto, 1984
- Dicrotendipes jobetus Epler, 1988
- Dicrotendipes jonmartini Epler, 1988
- Dicrotendipes koreanus Orel, 2016
- Dicrotendipes kribiicola (Kieffer, 1923)
- Dicrotendipes leei (Freeman, 1961)
- Dicrotendipes leucolabis Kieffer, 1922
- Dicrotendipes leucoscelis (Townes, 1945)
- Dicrotendipes lindae Epler, 1988
- Dicrotendipes lobiger (Kieffer, 1921)
- Dicrotendipes lobus Beck, 1962
- Dicrotendipes lucifer (Johannsen, 1907)
- Dicrotendipes milleri (Townes, 1945)
- Dicrotendipes modestus (Say, 1823)
- Dicrotendipes multispinosus Freeman, 1957
- Dicrotendipes neomodestus (Malloch, 1915)
- Dicrotendipes nervosus (Staeger, 1839)
- Dicrotendipes nestori Paggi, 1978
- Dicrotendipes nigrocephalicus Niitsuma, 1995
- Dicrotendipes nigrolineatus (Freeman, 1957)
- Dicrotendipes nilophilus (Kieffer, 1925)
- Dicrotendipes nipporivus Niitsuma, 1995
- Dicrotendipes nitididorsum (Kieffer, 1925)
- Dicrotendipes niveicauda (Kieffer, 1921)
- Dicrotendipes nocticola (Kieffer, 1911)
- Dicrotendipes notatus (Meigen, 1818)
- Dicrotendipes nudus Qi, Lin & Wang, 2012
- Dicrotendipes obrienorum Epler, 1987
- Dicrotendipes orientalis Zorina, 2006
- Dicrotendipes ovaleformis Zorina, 2001
- Dicrotendipes palearivillosus Epler, 1988
- Dicrotendipes pallidicornis (Goetghebuer, 1934)
- Dicrotendipes paradasylabidus Epler, 1988
- Dicrotendipes paterjohni Epler, 1988
- Dicrotendipes paxillus Guha, Chaudhuri & Nandi, 1982
- Dicrotendipes pellegriniensis Paggi, 1987
- Dicrotendipes pelochloris (Kieffer, 1912)
- Dicrotendipes penicillatus (Freeman, 1957)
- Dicrotendipes peringueyanus Kieffer, 1924
- Dicrotendipes pictipennis Kieffer, 1913
- Dicrotendipes pseudoconjunctus Epler, 1988
- Dicrotendipes punctatipennis (Kieffer, 1910)
- Dicrotendipes quaturodecimpunctatus (Goetghebuer, 1936)
- Dicrotendipes radinovskyi Epler, 1988
- Dicrotendipes rajasthani Singh & Kulshrestha, 1977
- Dicrotendipes regalis (Goetghebuer, 1936)
- Dicrotendipes reissi Epler, 1988
- Dicrotendipes saetanumerosus Qi, Lin & Wang, 2012
- Dicrotendipes sarinae Epler, 1988
- Dicrotendipes schoutendeni (Goetghebuer, 1936)
- Dicrotendipes semiviridis (Kieffer, 1911)
- Dicrotendipes septemmaculatus (Becker, 1908)
- Dicrotendipes simpsoni Epler, 1987
- Dicrotendipes sinicus Lin & Qi, 2021
- Dicrotendipes sinoposus Epler, 1987
- Dicrotendipes soccus Epler, 1988
- Dicrotendipes socionotus Guha, Chaudhuri & Nandi, 1982
- Dicrotendipes sudanicus (Freeman, 1957)
- Dicrotendipes tamaviridis Sasa, 1981
- Dicrotendipes taylori (Freeman, 1961)
- Dicrotendipes tenuiforceps (Kieffer, 1913)
- Dicrotendipes thanatogratus Epler, 1987
- Dicrotendipes tritomus (Thienemann & Kieffer, 1916)
- Dicrotendipes truncatus (Kieffer, 1922)
- Dicrotendipes unicus Zorina, 2001
- Dicrotendipes venetus (Marcuzzi, 1949)
- Dicrotendipes villarricensis Contreras-Lichtenberg, 1994
- Dicrotendipes vitellina (Freeman, 1961)
- Dicrotendipes weiqianensis Qi, Peng, Zhang & Wang, 2016
- Dicrotendipes yaeyamanus Hasegawa & Sasa, 1987
