= Jiří Janda =

Czech ornithologist and zoologist (1865–1938)

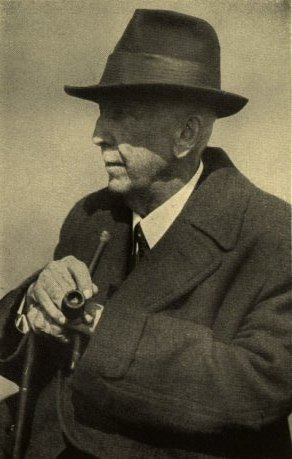

Jiří Janda (24 April 1865 – 25 August 1938) was a Czech ornithologist, zoologist and high school teacher. He was involved in the establishment of Prague Zoo where he served as the founding director.

== Life and work ==
Janda was born in Prague where his father Bohumil Janda Cidlinský was a Land Committee official who was also a poet and writer. As a young boy, he raised a goldfinch at home and became interested in birds. When he was ten years old, his father died and he was raised by his maternal grandparents in Poděbrady where he had more access to animals and wilderness. He attended Novoměstské gymnasium and graduated from Prague University studying under Antonín Frič between 1884 and 1889. He also studied at the University of Graz in 1887–1888. He studied under František Vejdovský, with whom he worked on the systematics of chordates (Gordiidae), and was his assistant in 1892–1893.

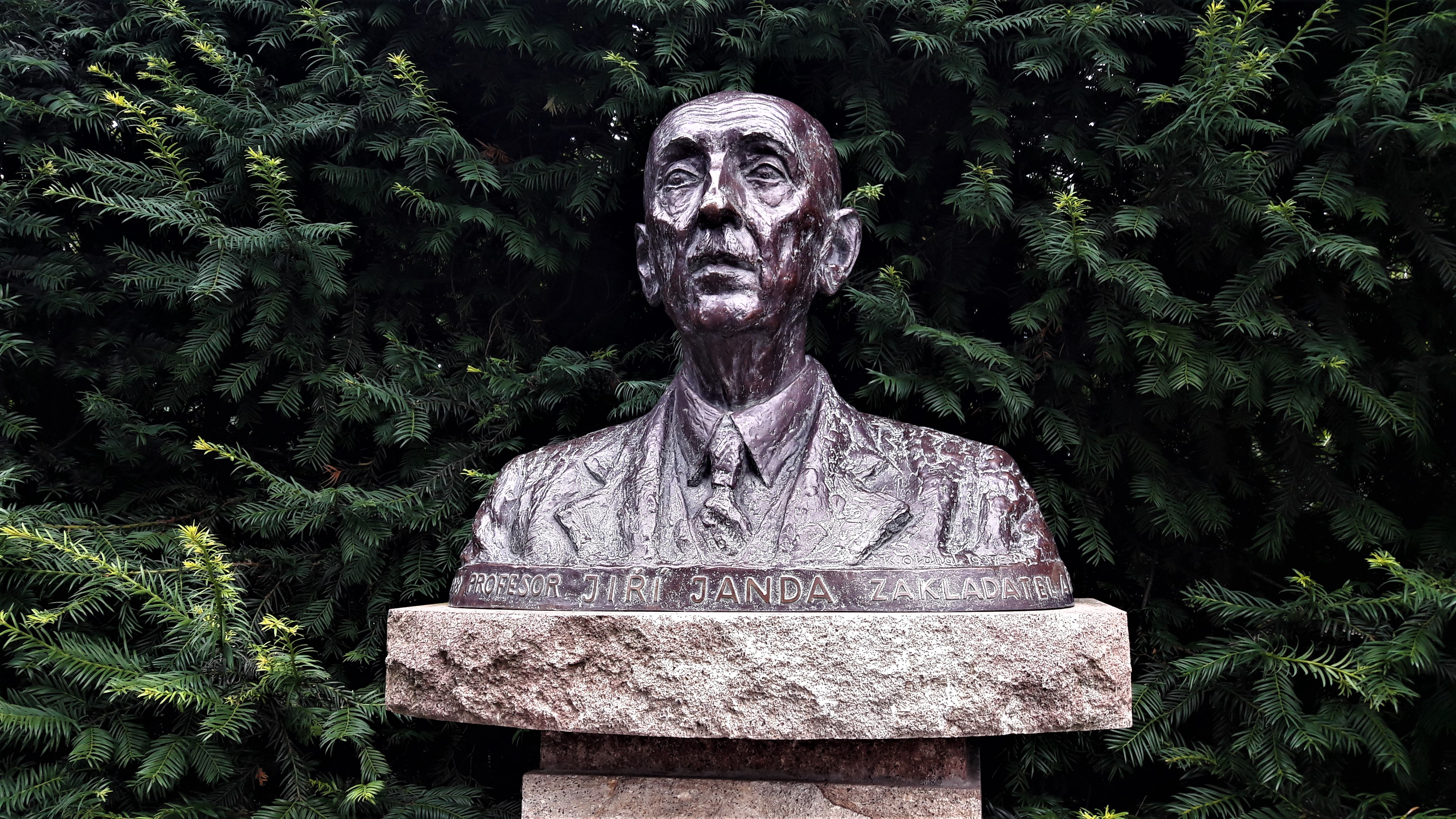
Bust of Janda at Prague zoo

After his studies, he taught at gymnasia around Moravia spending time in Uherské Hradiště, Kroměříž, Valašské Meziříčí and Brno until 1904. During these periods he kept notes on the birds of the regions. He began to write popular articles in magazines and dailies. From 1926 to 1930, he translated the bird volumes of Brehms Tierleben. In 1919 he was involved in the conservation of natural monuments and became involved in conservation of the Tatra National Park and the establishment of several bird reserves.

In 1928 he founded the Czechoslovak Ornithological Society and served as its chairman. Janda had a great love of zoos and had dreamt of a zoo in Prague for long and in 1936 his proposed the establishment of zoo was taken up only after 1926. Janda was made head of the committee to oversee it and it was opened on 28 September 1931 with him as the first director.
