= Synendotendipes =

Scientific classification
- Kingdom: Animalia
- Phylum: Arthropoda
- Clade: Pancrustacea
- Class: Insecta
- Order: Diptera
- Family: Chironomidae
- Subfamily: Chironominae
- Tribe: Chironomini
- Genus: Synendotendipes; Grodhaus, 1987

Type species
- Synendotendipes luski Grodhaus, 1987

Genus of flies

Synendotendipes is a genus of non-biting midges in the family Chironomidae. There are at least three described species in Synendotendipes.

== Species ==
These three species belong to the genus Synendotendipes:

- Synendotendipes kaluginae Durnova, 2010
- Synendotendipes luski Grodhaus, 1987
- Synendotendipes woodi (Freeman, 1957)
