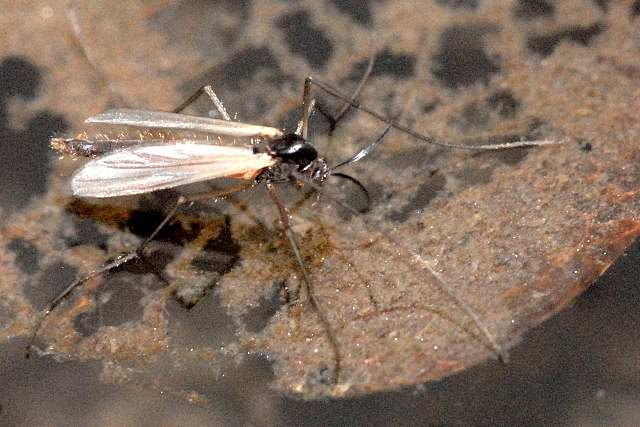
- Tribelos intextum, Belgium

Scientific classification
- Domain: Eukaryota
- Kingdom: Animalia
- Phylum: Arthropoda
- Class: Insecta
- Order: Diptera
- Family: Chironomidae
- Subfamily: Chironominae
- Tribe: Chironomini
- Genus: Tribelos; Townes, 1945

= Tribelos =

Genus of flies

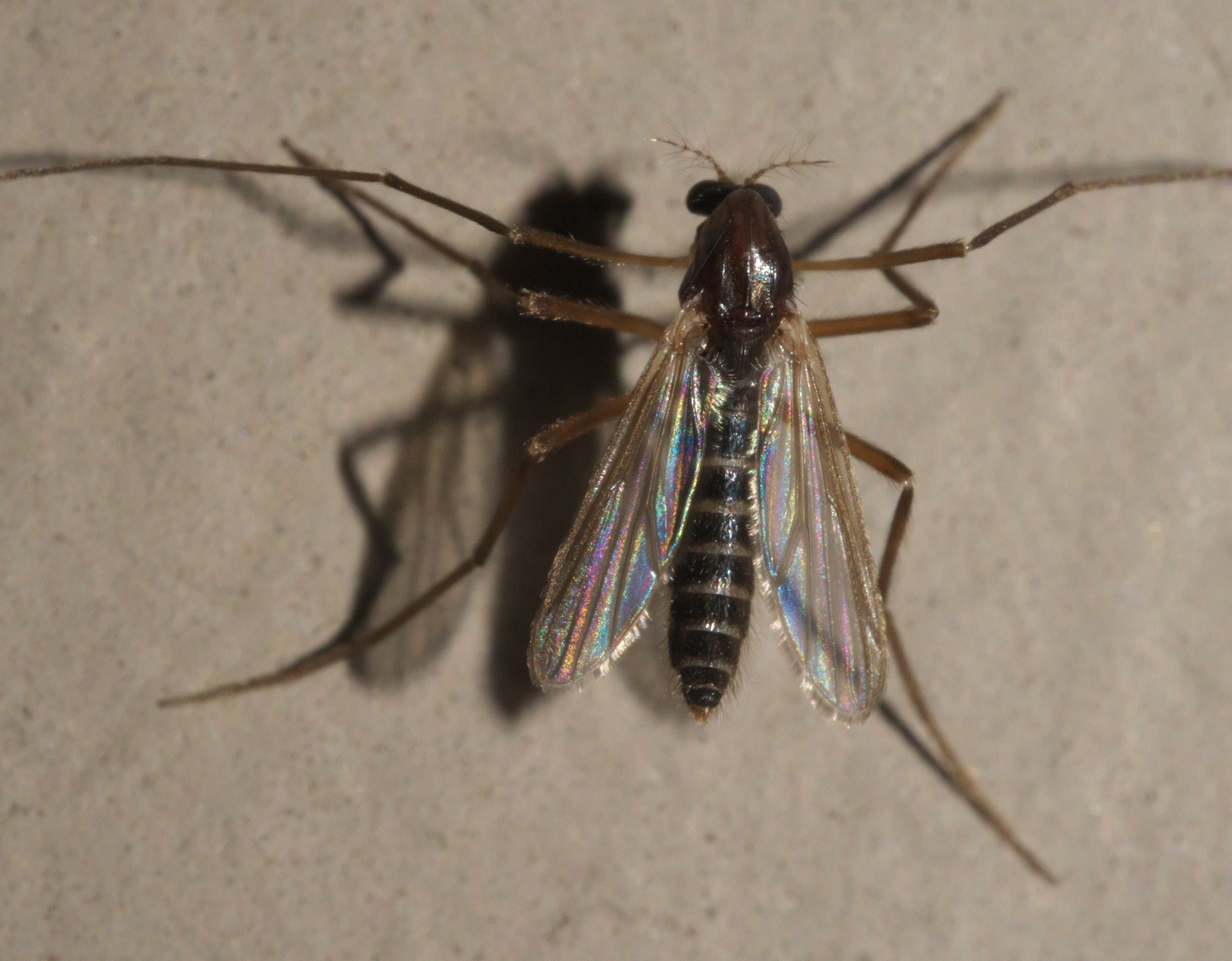
Tribelos, Florida

Tribelos is a genus of non-biting midges in the subfamily Chironominae of the bloodworm family Chironomidae.

== Species ==
These eight species belong to the genus Tribelos:

- Tribelos ater (Townes, 1945)
- Tribelos fuscicorne (Malloch, 1915) (sometimes fusicornis)
- Tribelos intextus (Walker, 1856) (Europe)
- Tribelos jucundus (Walker, 1848)
- Tribelos protextus (Townes, 1945)
- Tribelos quadripunctatus (Malloch, 1915)
- Tribelos subatrum Grodhaus, 1987
- Tribelos subletteorum Grodhaus, 1987
