= Saetheria =

Scientific classification
- Kingdom: Animalia
- Phylum: Arthropoda
- Clade: Pancrustacea
- Class: Insecta
- Order: Diptera
- Family: Chironomidae
- Subfamily: Chironominae
- Tribe: Chironomini
- Genus: Saetheria; Jackson, 1977

Genus of non-biting midges

Saetheria is a genus of non-biting midges in the family Chironomidae. There are about 16 described species in Saetheria, found in the Americas, Europe, and Asia.

== Species ==
These 16 species belong to the genus Saetheria:

- Saetheria angusta (Freeman, 1961)
- Saetheria aspidocephala (Linevich, 1959)
- Saetheria circinata Mukherjee & Hazra, 2023
- Saetheria digitata Yan, Saether & Wang, 2011
- Saetheria fuscipennis (Linevich, 1959)
- Saetheria glabra Yan, Saether & Wang, 2011
- Saetheria gomphocephala (Linevich, 1959)
- Saetheria hirta Saether, 1983
- Saetheria intermedia (Linevich, 1958)
- Saetheria magna (Linevich, 1959)
- Saetheria reissi Jackson, 1977
- Saetheria sacculifera (Chaudhuri & Chattopadhyay, 1990)
- Saetheria separata Yan, Saether & Wang, 2011
- Saetheria taishoabea (Sasa & Tanaka, 2001)
- Saetheria tamanipparai (Sasa, 1983)
- Saetheria tylus (Townes, 1945)
