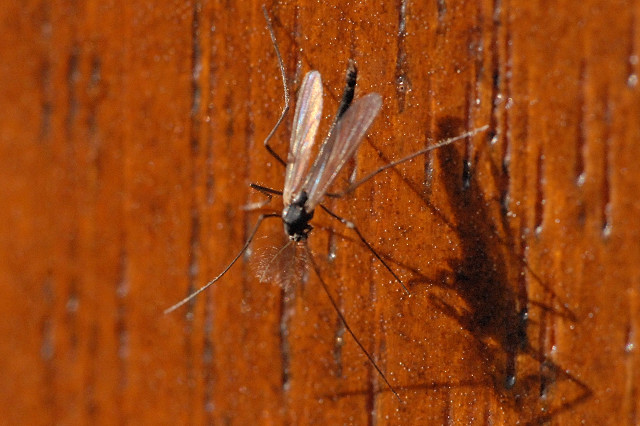
- Sergentia coracina, Belgium

Scientific classification
- Kingdom: Animalia
- Phylum: Arthropoda
- Clade: Pancrustacea
- Class: Insecta
- Order: Diptera
- Family: Chironomidae
- Subfamily: Chironominae
- Tribe: Chironomini
- Genus: Sergentia; Kieffer, 1922

Subgenera
- Baicalosergentia Linevich, 1959; Sergentia Kieffer, 1922

Synonyms
- Baicalosergentia Linevich, 1959

= Sergentia =

Genus of non-biting midges

Sergentia is a genus of non-biting midges in the family Chironomidae. There are about 11 described species in Sergentia. They are found primarily in northern Europe, but also in North America, Asia, and Africa.

== Species ==
These 11 species belong to the genus Sergentia:

- Sergentia albescens (Townes, 1945)
- Sergentia albodentata Pankratova, 1983
- Sergentia baicalensis Chernovsky, 1949
- Sergentia baueri Wülker, Kiknadze & Kerkis, 1998
- Sergentia brachicephala Pankratova, 1983
- Sergentia coracina (Zetterstedt, 1850)
- Sergentia flavodentata Chernovsky, 1949
- Sergentia koschowi Linevich, 1948
- Sergentia nebulosa Linevich, Aleksandrov & Proviz, 1984
- Sergentia prima Proviz & Proviz, 1997
- Sergentia rynocephala Linevich, Samburova & Aleksandrov, 1991
