= Endotribelos =

Scientific classification
- Domain: Eukaryota
- Kingdom: Animalia
- Phylum: Arthropoda
- Class: Insecta
- Order: Diptera
- Family: Chironomidae
- Subfamily: Chironominae
- Genus: Endotribelos; Grodhaus

Genus of non-biting midges

Endotribelos is a genus of nonbiting midges in the family Chironomidae. There are about 10 described species in Endotribelos.

== Species ==
These 12 species belong to the genus Endotribelos:

- Endotribelos albatum Sublette & Sasa, 1994
- Endotribelos bicolor Trivinho-Strixino & Pepinelli, 2015
- Endotribelos fulvidus Trivinho-Strixino & Pepinelli, 2015
- Endotribelos grodhausi Sublette & Sasa, 1994
- Endotribelos hesperium (Sublette, 1960)
- Endotribelos jaragua Trivinho-Strixino & Pepinelli, 2015
- Endotribelos jiboia Trivinho-Strixino & Pepinelli, 2015
- Endotribelos redimiculum Qi, Lin & Wang, 2013
- Endotribelos semibruneus Trivinho-Strixino & Pepinelli, 2015
- Endotribelos sublettei Trivinho-Strixino & Pepinelli, 2015
