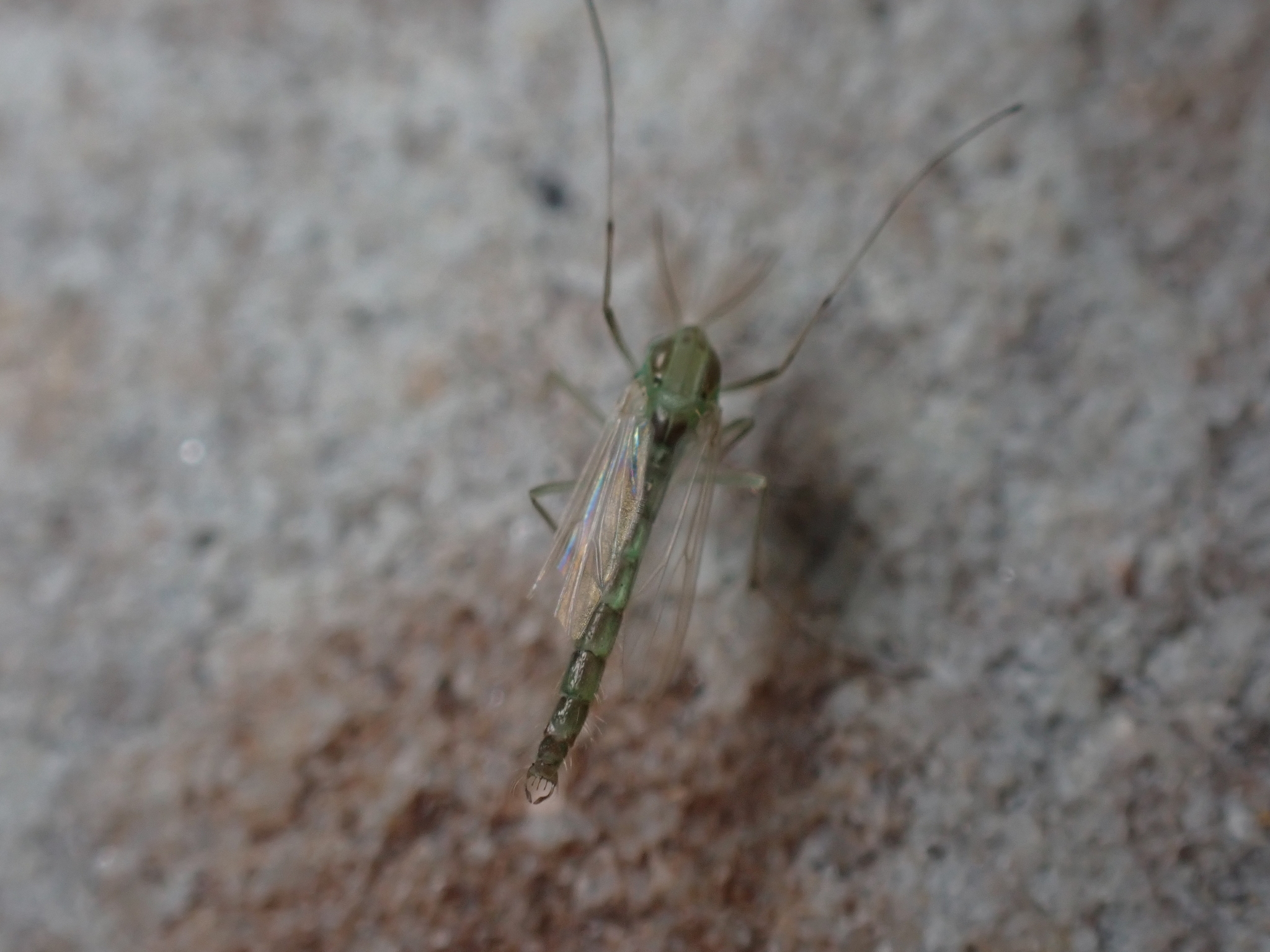
- Parachironomus monochromus, Colorado

Scientific classification
- Kingdom: Animalia
- Phylum: Arthropoda
- Clade: Pancrustacea
- Class: Insecta
- Order: Diptera
- Family: Chironomidae
- Subfamily: Chironominae
- Tribe: Chironomini
- Genus: Parachironomus; Lenz, 1921

Synonyms
- Dychironomus Lenz, 1941; Kribiocryptus Kieffer, 1921; Nilomyia Kieffer, 1921; Parachironmus; Paraharnischia Lenz, 1941

= Parachironomus =

Genus of non-biting midges

Parachironomus is a genus of non-biting midges in the family Chironomidae. There are more than 90 described species in Parachironomus, found worldwide.

== Species ==
These 91 species belong to the genus Parachironomus:

- Parachironomus aberrans Spies, Fittkau & Reiss, 1994
- Parachironomus abortivus (Malloch, 1915)
- Parachironomus aculeatus (Kieffer, 1921)
- Parachironomus acutus (Goetghebuer, 1936)
- Parachironomus agraensis Maheshwari & Agarwal, 1993
- Parachironomus alatus (Beck, 1962)
- Parachironomus apalai Spies, Fittkau & Reiss, 1994
- Parachironomus aquilonis Orel, 2017
- Parachironomus arcuatus (Goetghebuer, 1919)
- Parachironomus atroari Spies, Fittkau & Reiss, 1994
- Parachironomus avicularis (Kieffer, 1921)
- Parachironomus biannulatus (Staeger, 1839)
- Parachironomus bicornutus (Kieffer, 1927)
- Parachironomus camajura Spies, Fittkau & Reiss, 1994
- Parachironomus carinatus (Townes, 1945)
- Parachironomus cayapo Spies, Fittkau & Reiss, 1994
- Parachironomus chaetaolus (Sublette, 1960)
- Parachironomus cinctellus (Goetghebuer, 1921)
- Parachironomus coronatus (Kieffer, 1922)
- Parachironomus cryptotomus (Kieffer, 1915)
- Parachironomus cylindricus (Freeman, 1959)
- Parachironomus danicus Lehmann, 1970
- Parachironomus delinificus (Skuse, 1889)
- Parachironomus demissum (Yan, Wang & Bu, 2012)
- Parachironomus dewulfianus (Goetghebuer, 1934)
- Parachironomus digitalis (Edwards, 1929)
- Parachironomus directus (Dendy & Sublette, 1959)
- Parachironomus elodeae (Townes, 1945)
- Parachironomus farinosus (Kieffer, 1926)
- Parachironomus forceps (Townes, 1945)
- Parachironomus formosanus Kieffer, 1922
- Parachironomus frequens (Johannsen, 1905)
- Parachironomus gillespieae Spies, 2000
- Parachironomus guarani Spies, Fittkau & Reiss, 1994
- Parachironomus harunasecundus Sasa, 1996
- Parachironomus hazelriggi Spies, 2000
- Parachironomus hirtalatus
- Parachironomus inageheus Sasa, Kitami & Suzuki, 2001
- Parachironomus intermedius Zorina & Makarchenko, 2000
- Parachironomus khatyrka Orel, 2017
- Parachironomus kuramaexpandus Sasa, 1989
- Parachironomus kuzini Shilova, 1969
- Parachironomus lewisi (Freeman, 1957)
- Parachironomus limnael (Guibé, 1942)
- Parachironomus longistilus Paggi, 1977
- Parachironomus luctuosus (Kieffer, 1926)
- Parachironomus lupus Trivinho-Strixino, Silva & Roque, 2010
- Parachironomus major (Goetghebuer, 1921)
- Parachironomus manaos Spies, Fittkau & Reiss, 1994
- Parachironomus matapi Spies, Fittkau & Reiss, 1994
- Parachironomus mauricii (Kruseman, 1933)
- Parachironomus mirim Spies, Fittkau & Reiss, 1994
- Parachironomus monochromes van der Wulp, 1874
- Parachironomus monochromus (Wulp, 1875)
- Parachironomus nankaiensis Liu, Wang, Zhao, Wang, Zhang, Yan & Lin, 2023
- Parachironomus nigrofasciatus (Freeman, 1961)
- Parachironomus osa Spies, Fittkau & Reiss, 1994
- Parachironomus pallidiventris (Kieffer, 1921)
- Parachironomus paradigitalis Brundin, 1949
- Parachironomus pararostratus (Harnisch, 1923)
- Parachironomus parilis (Walker, 1856)
- Parachironomus pectinatellae (Dendy & Sublette, 1959)
- Parachironomus pediformis Lenz, 1951
- Parachironomus potamogeti (Townes, 1945)
- Parachironomus poyangensis Yan, Dai, Jiang, Guo, Liu, Ge, Wang & Pan, 2015
- Parachironomus primitivus (Johannsen, 1932)
- Parachironomus pseudovarus Zorina, 2003
- Parachironomus puberulus (Edwards, 1931)
- Parachironomus salsus Mukherjee & Hazra, 2023
- Parachironomus schneideri Beck & Beck, 1969
- Parachironomus siljanensis Brundin, 1949
- Parachironomus sinuatus (Freeman, 1957)
- Parachironomus spissatus Brundin, 1947
- Parachironomus subalpinus (Goetghebuer, 1931)
- Parachironomus sublettei (Beck, 1961)
- Parachironomus supparillis (Edwards, 1931)
- Parachironomus swammerdami (Kruseman, 1933)
- Parachironomus tenuicaudatus (Malloch, 1915)
- Parachironomus ticuna Spies, Fittkau & Reiss, 1994
- Parachironomus tirio Spies, Fittkau & Reiss, 1994
- Parachironomus tobaquartus Kikuchi & Sasa, 1990
- Parachironomus transversalis (Kieffer, 1922)
- Parachironomus turficola (Kieffer, 1927)
- Parachironomus unicalcar (Freeman, 1957)
- Parachironomus valdiviensis Spies, 2008
- Parachironomus varus (Goetghebuer, 1921)
- Parachironomus vistosus Paggi, 1979
- Parachironomus vitiosus (Goetghebuer, 1921)
- Parachironomus waika Spies, Fittkau & Reiss, 1994
- Parachironomus wangi Lui & Lin, 2023
- Parachironomus yanomani Spies, Fittkau & Reiss, 1994
