= Jan Zavřel =

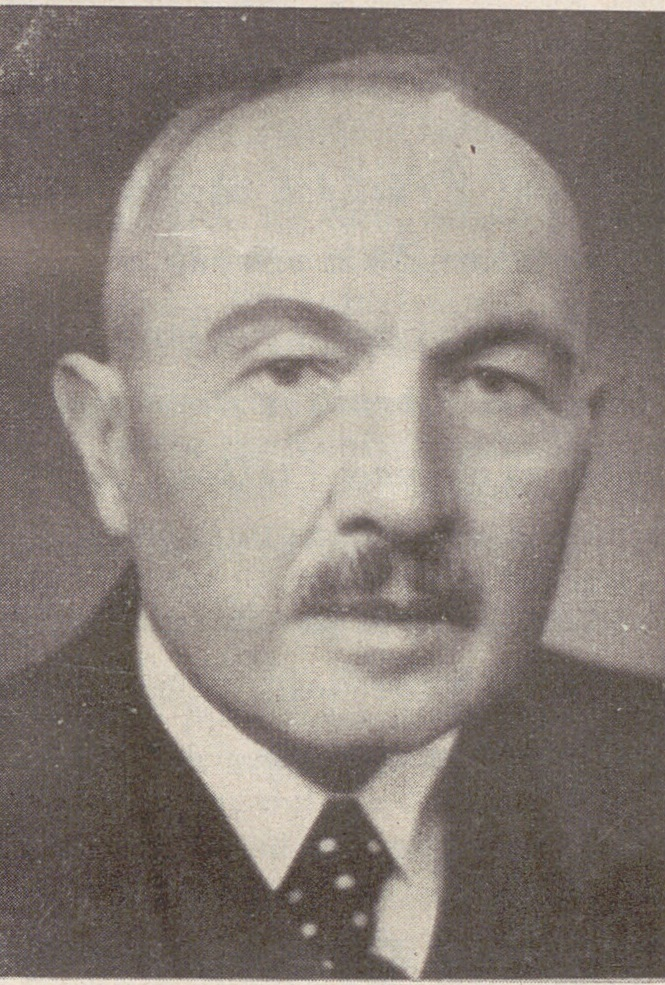
- Zavřel in 1920
- Born: 5 May 1879; Třebíč, Moravia, Austria-Hungary
- Died: 3 June 1946 (aged 67); Brno, Czechoslovakia
- Education: Charles University
- Employer: Masaryk University
- Known for: Zoology and entomology

Jan Zavřel (5 May 1879 – 3 June 1946) was a Czech zoologist and entomologist. He served as a dean and rector of Masaryk University in Brno. He was a specialist on the Chironomidae and the insect genera Zavrelia and Zavreliella are name after him.

== Biography ==
Zavřel was born on 5 May 1879 in Třebíč, where his father was the botanist František Zavřel (1843–1905). After studies at the Třebíč gymnasium, he studied zoology under František Vejdovský and graduated in 1903 from Charles University. He then became a school teacher working in Hodonín and Hradec Králové. He joined Masaryk University in 1920 and was founder of the institute of zoology. In 1933 he became rector of the Masaryk University. He studied the Chironomidae of the region.

Zavřel died on 3 June 1946 in Brno, at the age of 67.
