= Lauterborniella =

Scientific classification
- Kingdom: Animalia
- Phylum: Arthropoda
- Clade: Pancrustacea
- Class: Insecta
- Order: Diptera
- Family: Chironomidae
- Subfamily: Chironominae
- Tribe: Chironomini
- Genus: Lauterborniella; Thienemann & Bause, 1913

Genus of flies

Lauterborniella is a genus of non-biting midges in the family Chironomidae, found in Europe, Africa, and the Americas. It is not to be confused with the alga genus Lauterborniella (algae).

== Species ==
These nine species belong to the genus Lauterborniella, according to Systema Dipterorum and Catalogue of Life:

- Lauterborniella agrayloides (Kieffer, 1911)
- Lauterborniella annulipes (Johannsen, 1932)
- Lauterborniella cristata (Kieffer, 1913)
- Lauterborniella fuscoguttata (Kieffer, 1922)
- Lauterborniella longiventris (Goetghebuer, 1936)
- Lauterborniella perpulchra (Coquillett, 1902)
- Lauterborniella pulchra (Kieffer, 1921)
- Lauterborniella solangelhugo Namayandeh & Vasquez, 2026
- Lauterborniella varipennis (Coquillett, 1902)
