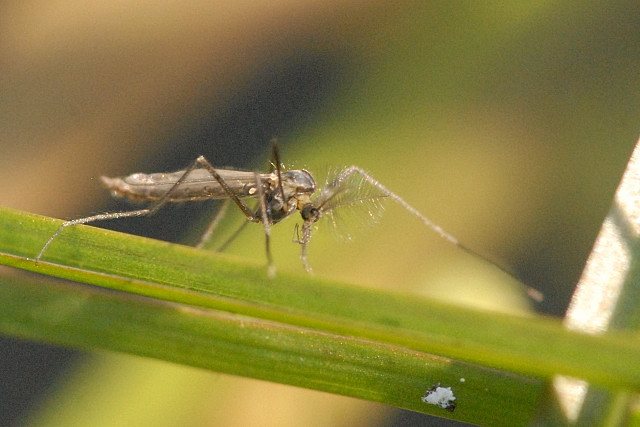
- Cryptotendipes pseudotener, Belgium

Scientific classification
- Domain: Eukaryota
- Kingdom: Animalia
- Phylum: Arthropoda
- Class: Insecta
- Order: Diptera
- Family: Chironomidae
- Subfamily: Chironominae
- Tribe: Chironomini
- Genus: Cryptotendipes; Beck & Beck, 1969

= Cryptotendipes =

Genus of non-biting midges

Cryptotendipes is a genus of nonbiting midges in the family Chironomidae. There are more than 20 described species in Cryptotendipes, found in the holarctic.

== Species ==
These 26 species belong to the genus Cryptotendipes:

- Cryptotendipes acalcar Reiss, 1990
- Cryptotendipes aculeatus Pal & Hazra, 2018
- Cryptotendipes acutus (Goetghebuer, 1936)
- Cryptotendipes ariel (Sublette, 1960)
- Cryptotendipes bullum Song & Wang, 2020
- Cryptotendipes casuarius (Townes, 1945)
- Cryptotendipes daitogeheus Sasa & Suzuki, 2001
- Cryptotendipes darbyi (Sublette, 1960)
- Cryptotendipes emorsus (Townes, 1945)
- Cryptotendipes hibaraprima (Sasa, 1993)
- Cryptotendipes holsatus Lenz, 1959
- Cryptotendipes irioabeus Sasa & Suzuki, 2000
- Cryptotendipes lyalichi Zorina, 2006
- Cryptotendipes medialis Mukherjee, Mukherjee & Hazra, 2020
- Cryptotendipes mongolijeus Sasa & Suzuki, 1997
- Cryptotendipes nigronitens (Edwards, 1929)
- Cryptotendipes nodus Yan, Tang & Wang, 2005
- Cryptotendipes parallelus Yan, Tang & Wang, 2005
- Cryptotendipes pflugfelderi Reiss, 1964
- Cryptotendipes pilicuspis Saether, 1977
- Cryptotendipes pseudotener Goetghebuer, 1922
- Cryptotendipes rutteri Epler, 2018
- Cryptotendipes tobasecundus Kikuchi & Sasa, 1990
- Cryptotendipes tobatertius Kikuchi & Sasa, 1990
- Cryptotendipes tuberosus
- Cryptotendipes usmaensis (Pagast, 1931)
