= Beckidia =

Scientific classification
- Kingdom: Animalia
- Phylum: Arthropoda
- Clade: Pancrustacea
- Class: Insecta
- Order: Diptera
- Family: Chironomidae
- Subfamily: Chironominae
- Tribe: Chironomini
- Genus: Beckidia; Kieffer, 1913

Type species
- Harnischia (Cladopelma) tethys Townes, 1945

Synonyms
- Beckiella Saether, 1977

Genus of non-biting midges

Beckidia is a genus of non-biting midges in the family Chironomidae. There are about seven described species in Beckidia.

== Species ==
These seven species belong to the genus Beckidia:

- Beckidia binum (Yan, Jin & Wang, 2008)
- Beckidia biraensis Zorina, 2006
- Beckidia connexa Zorina, 2006
- Beckidia hirsti (Freeman, 1957)
- Beckidia inflata Mukherjee & Hazra, 2023
- Beckidia tethys (Townes, 1945)
- Beckidia zabolotzskyi (Goetghebuer, 1938)
