= Einfeldia =

Scientific classification
- Kingdom: Animalia
- Phylum: Arthropoda
- Clade: Pancrustacea
- Class: Insecta
- Order: Diptera
- Family: Chironomidae
- Subfamily: Chironominae
- Tribe: Chironomini
- Genus: Einfeldia; Keiffer

Synonyms
- Benthalia Lipina, 1939; Enfeldia

Genus of non-biting midges

Einfeldia is a genus of midges in the family Chironomidae. There are at least 20 described species in Einfeldia, found in North America, Europe, and Asia.

== Species ==
These 20 species belong to the genus Einfeldia:

- Einfeldia aberlencii Moubayed & Langton, 2025
- Einfeldia atitlanensis Sublette & Sasa, 1994
- Einfeldia austini Beck & Beck, 1970
- Einfeldia australiensis (Freeman) Freeman
- Einfeldia carbonaria (Meigen, 1804)
- Einfeldia dissidens (Walker, 1856)
- Einfeldia dissita Aleksandrov, 1984
- Einfeldia longipes (Staeger, 1839)
- Einfeldia loripes (Guha & Chaudhuri, 1981)
- Einfeldia mendax (Storå, 1936)
- Einfeldia natchitocheae (Sublette, 1964)
- Einfeldia nojiriprima Sasa, 1991
- Einfeldia ocellata Hashimoto, 1985
- Einfeldia pagana (Meigen), 1838)
- Einfeldia palaearctica Ashe, 1991
- Einfeldia pectoralis Kieffer, 1924
- Einfeldia pritiensis Signh & Rawal, 2016
- Einfeldia sasai Yamamoto & Yamamoto, 2018
- Einfeldia storai (Goetghebuer & Lenz, 1954)
- Einfeldia wiedemanni (Goetghebuer, 1931)
