= Chernovskiia =

Scientific classification
- Kingdom: Animalia
- Phylum: Arthropoda
- Clade: Pancrustacea
- Class: Insecta
- Order: Diptera
- Family: Chironomidae
- Subfamily: Chironominae
- Tribe: Chironomini
- Genus: Chernovskiia; Saether 1977

Synonyms
- Monstrella Chernovsky, 1940

Genus of non-biting midges

Chernovskiia is a genus of non-biting midges in the family Chironomidae. There are at least three described species in Chernovskiia.

== Species ==
These three species belong to the genus Chernovskiia:

- Chernovskiia amphitrite (Townes, 1945)
- Chernovskiia macrocera Saether, 1977
- Chernovskiia orbicus (Townes, 1945)
