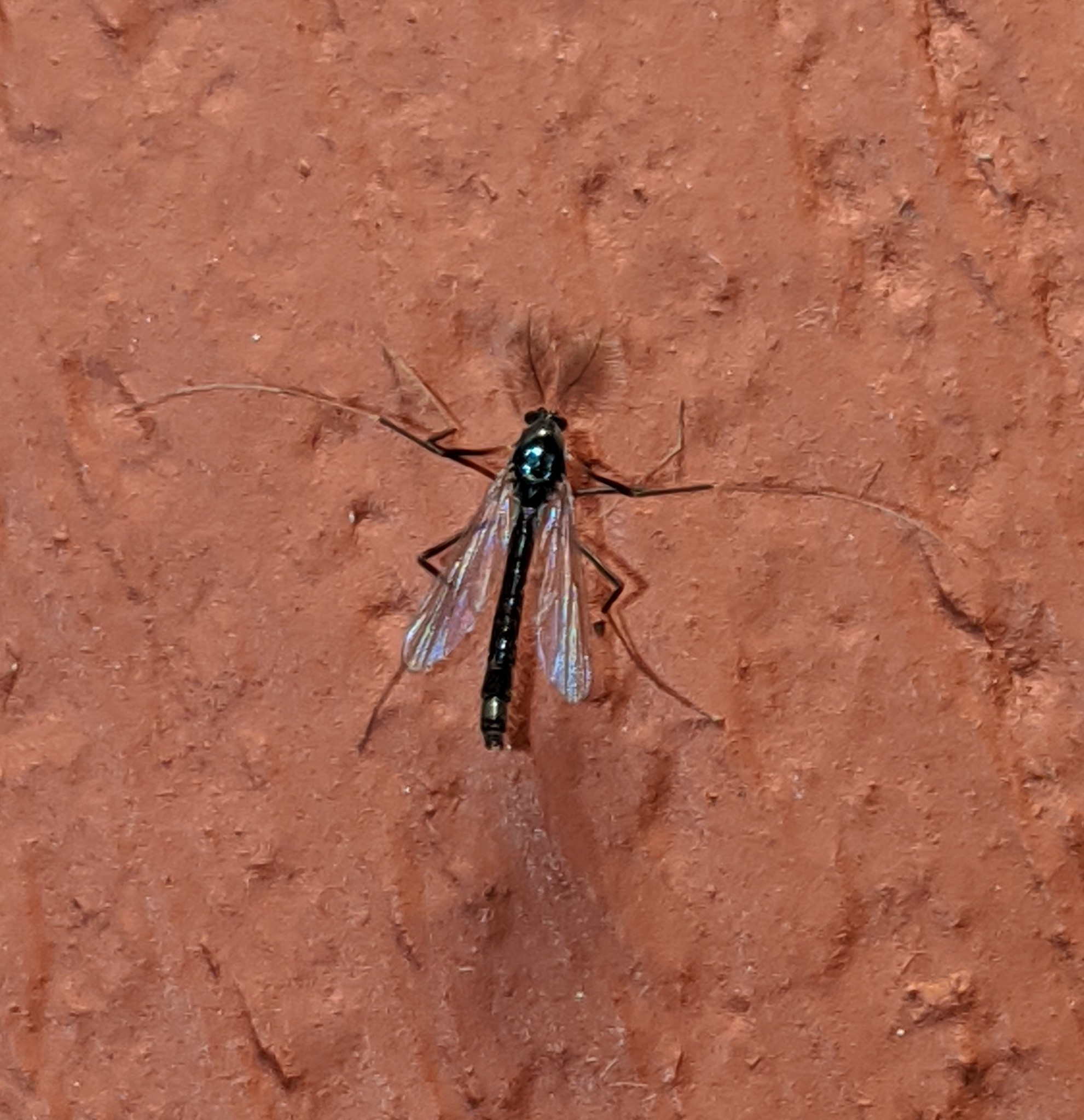
- Omisus, Canada

Scientific classification
- Kingdom: Animalia
- Phylum: Arthropoda
- Clade: Pancrustacea
- Class: Insecta
- Order: Diptera
- Family: Chironomidae
- Subfamily: Chironominae
- Tribe: Chironomini
- Genus: Omisus; Townes, 1945

Type species
- Omisus pica Townes, 1945

= Omisus =

Genus of non-biting midges

Omisus is a genus of non-biting midges in the family Chironomidae. There are at least three described species in Omisus.

== Species ==
These species belong to the genus Omisus:

- Omisus browni Caldwell, 2000
- Omisus caledonicus (Edwards, 1932)
- Omisus pica Townes, 1945
