= Cladopelma =

- Cladopelma viridulum

Scientific classification
- Kingdom: Animalia
- Phylum: Arthropoda
- Clade: Pancrustacea
- Class: Insecta
- Order: Diptera
- Family: Chironomidae
- Subfamily: Chironominae
- Tribe: Chironomini
- Genus: Cladopelma; Kieffer, 1921

Synonyms
- Cryptocladopelma Lenz, 1941; Cryptocladopelma Townes, 1945

Genus of non-biting midges

Cladopelma is a genus of non-biting midges in the subfamily Chironominae and tribe Chironomini of the bloodworm family Chironomidae. Species are distributed world-wide (Cranston et al. 1989, Yan et al. 2008), with species represented in the Palaearctic, Nearctic, Neotropical, Afrotropical, Sino-Indian, and Austroasian regions.

== Species ==
The following species are recognised in the genus Cladopelma:

- Cladopelma acutum Yamamoto & Yamamoto, 2022
- Cladopelma amachaerum (Townes, 1945)
- Cladopelma armeniacum (Chernovsky, 1949)
- Cladopelma bicarinatum (Brundin, 1947)
- Cladopelma collator (Townes, 1945)
- Cladopelma costum Yan, Jin & Wang, 2008
- Cladopelma curtivalva (Kieffer, 1917)
- Cladopelma daktylos (Walley, 1934)
- Cladopelma edwardsi (Kruseman, 1933)
- Cladopelma forcipes (Rempel, 1939)
- Cladopelma forcipis (Rempel, 1939)
- Cladopelma fridmanae (Chernovsky, 1949)
- Cladopelma galeator (Townes, 1945)
- Cladopelma goetghebueri Spies & Saether, 2004
- Cladopelma inawabeceus (Sasa, Kitami & Suzuki, 2000)
- Cladopelma inflexum (Freeman, 1957)
- Cladopelma kamalanagari Maheshwari & Agarwal, 1993
- Cladopelma krusemani (Goetghebuer, 1935)
- Cladopelma laccophila (Kieffer, 1922)
- Cladopelma lacustre (Lenz, 1960)
- Cladopelma overmeirense (Goetghebuer, 1932)
- Cladopelma spectabile (Townes, 1945)
- Cladopelma subnigrum (Brundin, 1947)
- Cladopelma virescens (Meigen, 1818)
- Cladopelma viridulum (Linnaeus, 1767)
