= Paracladopelma =

Scientific classification
- Kingdom: Animalia
- Phylum: Arthropoda
- Clade: Pancrustacea
- Class: Insecta
- Order: Diptera
- Family: Chironomidae
- Subfamily: Chironominae
- Tribe: Chironomini
- Genus: Paracladopelma; Harnisch, 1923

Genus of non-biting midges

Paracladopelma is a genus of non-biting midges in the family Chironomidae. There are more than 40 described species in the genus, and are found worldwide.

== Species ==
These 46 species belong to the genus Paracladopelma:

- Paracladopelma albiforceps (Kieffer, 1921)
- Paracladopelma alphaeum (Sublette, 1960)
- Paracladopelma aratra Chaudhuri & Chattopadhyay, 1990
- Paracladopelma ater (Freeman, 1954)
- Paracladopelma augustum Zorina, 2006
- Paracladopelma brincki (Freeman, 1957)
- Paracladopelma bui Yan, Jin & Wang, 2008
- Paracladopelma camptolabis (Kieffer, 1913)
- Paracladopelma cirratum Yan, Jin & Wang, 2008
- Paracladopelma clavatum Mukherjee, Hui & Hazra, 2023
- Paracladopelma crenum Yan, Jin & Wang, 2008
- Paracladopelma digitum Yan, Jin & Wang, 2008
- Paracladopelma diutinistylum Dutta & Chaudhuri, 1996
- Paracladopelma doris (Townes, 1945)
- Paracladopelma faeroense (Kieffer, 1915)
- Paracladopelma furudoprima Sasa & Arakawa, 1994
- Paracladopelma galaptera (Townes, 1945)
- Paracladopelma globosum Zorina, 2006
- Paracladopelma graminicolor (Kieffer, 1925)
- Paracladopelma hibarasecundum Sasa, 1993
- Paracladopelma jacksoni Zorina, 2003
- Paracladopelma kuramaclarum Sasa, 1989
- Paracladopelma laminatum (Kieffer, 1921)
- Paracladopelma loganae Beck & Beck, 1969
- Paracladopelma melutense (Freeman, 1957)
- Paracladopelma mikiana (Goetghebuer & Lenz, 1937)
- Paracladopelma nais (Townes, 1945)
- Paracladopelma nereis (Townes, 1945)
- Paracladopelma nigritulum (Goetghebuer, 1942)
- Paracladopelma nigrotibia (Bhattacharya, Dutta & Chaudhuri, 1985)
- Paracladopelma nixe (Townes, 1945)
- Paracladopelma nudiappendiculatum Kawai, 1991
- Paracladopelma ovatum Mukherjee, Hui & Hazra, 2023
- Paracladopelma pseudocamptolabis Zorina, 2006
- Paracladopelma pseudolabis (Kieffer, 1915)
- Paracladopelma pugnum Kawai, 1991
- Paracladopelma pullatum (Freeman, 1957)
- Paracladopelma reidi (Freeman, 1957)
- Paracladopelma rhoedesianum (Kieffer, 1923)
- Paracladopelma rolli (Chernovsky, 1949)
- Paracladopelma rudebecki (Freeman, 1955)
- Paracladopelma tamahikawai Sasa, 1983
- Paracladopelma undine (Townes, 1945)
- Paracladopelma urkanense Zorina, 2006
- Paracladopelma viride (Kieffer, 1921)
- Paracladopelma winnelli Jackson, 1977
