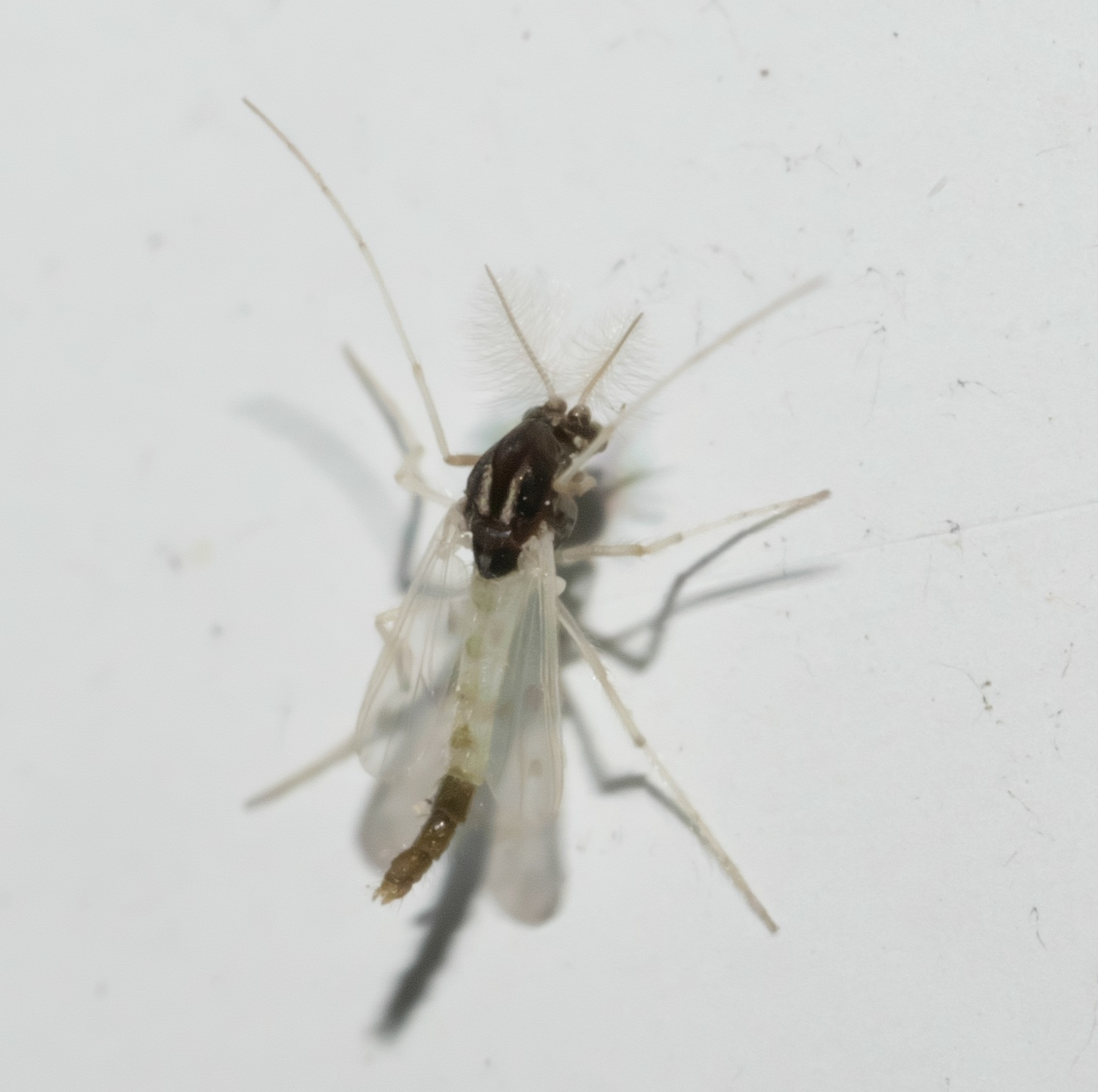
- Apedilum elachistus, Oklahoma

Scientific classification
- Kingdom: Animalia
- Phylum: Arthropoda
- Clade: Pancrustacea
- Class: Insecta
- Order: Diptera
- Family: Chironomidae
- Subfamily: Chironominae
- Tribe: Chironomini
- Genus: Apedilum; Townes, 1945

Type species
- Apedilum subcinctum Townes, 1945

= Apedilum =

Genus of non-biting midges

Apedilum is a genus of non-biting midges of the bloodworm family Chironomidae. The genus was previously considered a junior synonym of Paralauterborniella, but was restored as a separate genus by J. H. Epler (1988) for the species A. elachistus and A. subcinctum.

== Species ==
- Apedilum elachistum Townes, 1945
- Apedilum subcinctum Townes, 1945
