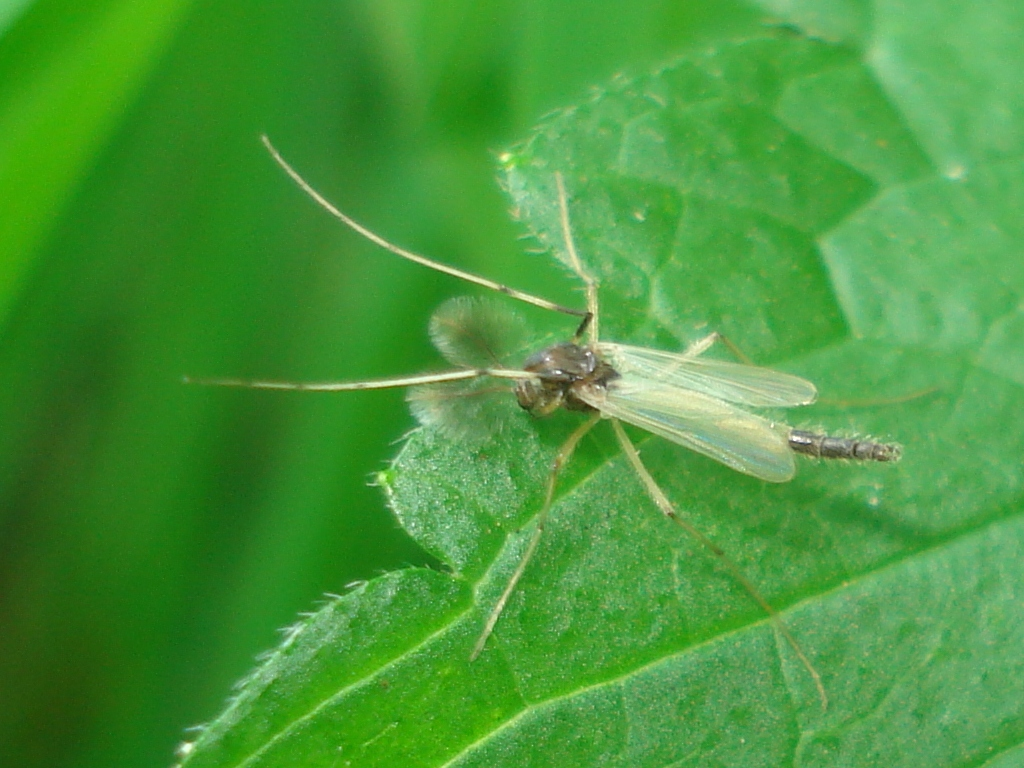
- Microtendipes pedellus

Scientific classification
- Kingdom: Animalia
- Phylum: Arthropoda
- Clade: Pancrustacea
- Class: Insecta
- Order: Diptera
- Family: Chironomidae
- Subfamily: Chironominae
- Tribe: Chironomini
- Genus: Microtendipes; Kieffer, 1915

= Microtendipes =

Genus of non-biting midges

Microtendipes is a genus of midges in the family Chironomidae. There are more than 60 described species in Microtendipes.

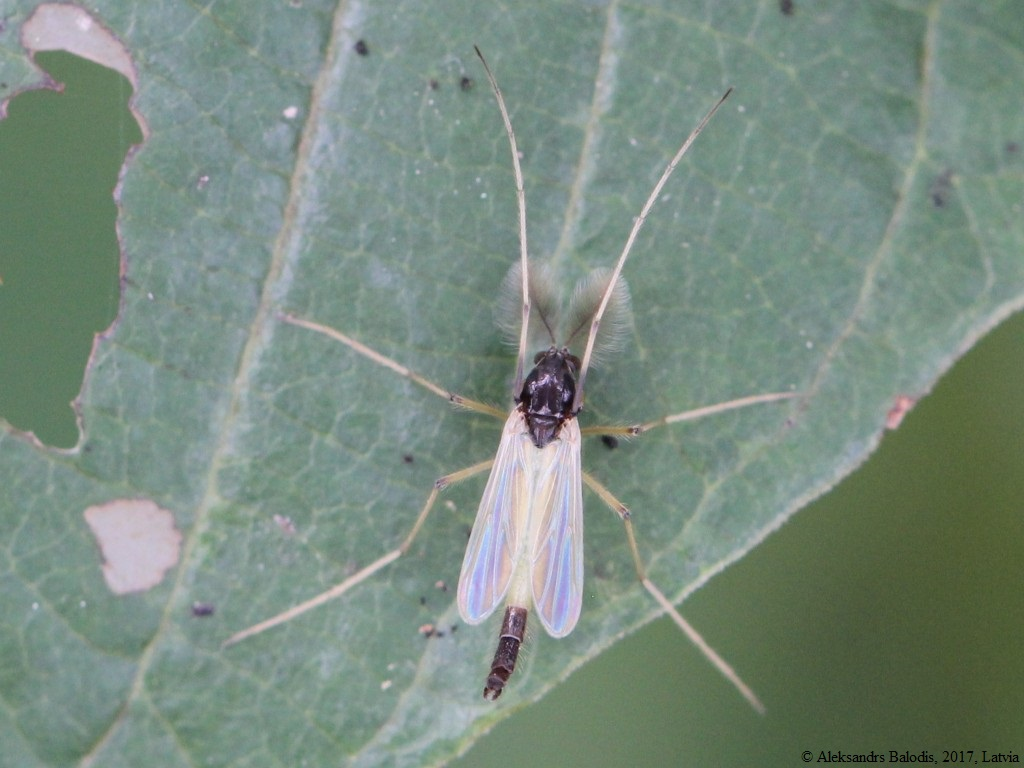
Microtendipes pedellus

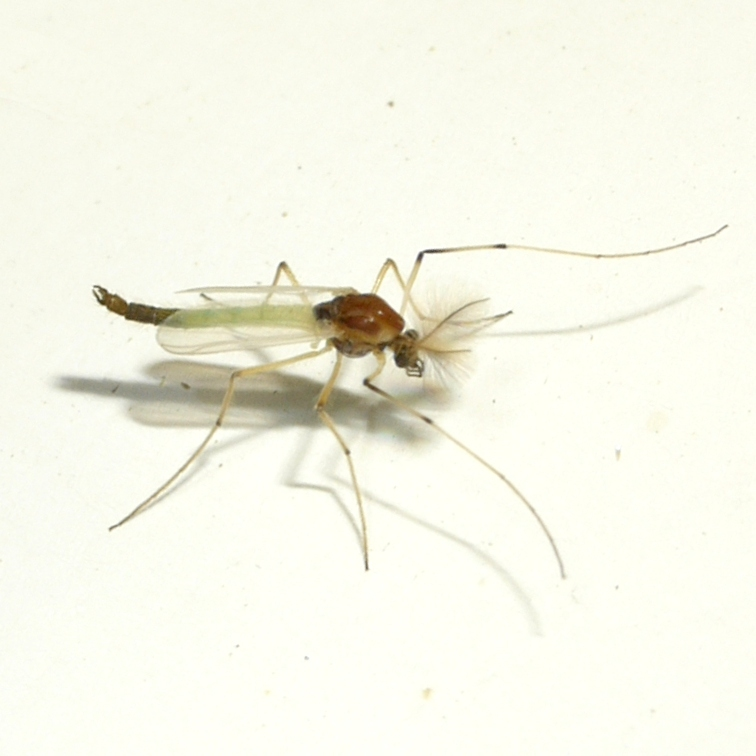
Microtendipes caducus, Wisconsin

== Species ==
These 62 species belong to the genus Microtendipes:

- Microtendipes albitarsis (Lundström, 1910)
- Microtendipes albus (Goetghebuer, 1936)
- Microtendipes angustus Qi & Wang, 2006
- Microtendipes anticus (Walker, 1848)
- Microtendipes baishanzuensis Song & Qi, 2023
- Microtendipes bicoloripennis Freeman, 1961
- Microtendipes bifasciatus (Kieffer, 1921)
- Microtendipes bimaculatus Song & Qi, 2023
- Microtendipes brevissimus Qi, Lin & Wang, 2014
- Microtendipes brevitarsis Brundin, 1947
- Microtendipes britteni (Edwards, 1929)
- Microtendipes caducus Townes, 1945
- Microtendipes caelum Townes, 1945
- Microtendipes chloris (Meigen, 1818)
- Microtendipes confinis (Meigen, 1830)
- Microtendipes diffinis Meigen
- Microtendipes distalis Kieffer, 1918
- Microtendipes famiefeus Sasa, 1996
- Microtendipes flavipes (Kieffer, 1921)
- Microtendipes globosus Qi, Li, Wang & Shao, 2014
- Microtendipes kahuziensis Lehmann, 1979
- Microtendipes lamprogaster (Kieffer, 1914)
- Microtendipes lentiginosus Freeman, 1955
- Microtendipes litoris Lehmann, 1981
- Microtendipes lugubris Kieffer, 1921
- Microtendipes luteipes (Kieffer, 1922)
- Microtendipes masaakii Ashe, 1990
- Microtendipes microsandulum Kieffer, 1915
- Microtendipes morii Moubayed-Breil, 2017
- Microtendipes nielseni Goetghebuer, 1929
- Microtendipes nigellus Hirvenoja, 1963
- Microtendipes nigrithorax Song & Qi, 2023
- Microtendipes nigritia Langton, 2017
- Microtendipes nitidus (Meigen, 1818)
- Microtendipes numerosus Lehmann, 1979
- Microtendipes obscurus (Meigen, 1804)
- Microtendipes parachloris Niitsuma & Tang, 2017
- Microtendipes paratamagouti Ree, 2012
- Microtendipes pedellus (De Geer, 1776)
- Microtendipes quasicaducas
- Microtendipes quasicauducas Qi, 2006
- Microtendipes robustus Song & Qi, 2023
- Microtendipes rydalensis (Edwards, 1929)
- Microtendipes satchelli Freeman, 1955
- Microtendipes schenkling Kieffer, 1921
- Microtendipes scheucki Reiss, 1997
- Microtendipes schuecki Reiss, 1997
- Microtendipes shoukomaki Sasa, 1989
- Microtendipes taitae (Kieffer, 1913)
- Microtendipes tarsalis (Walker, 1856)
- Microtendipes tobaquintus Kikuchi & Sasa, 1990
- Microtendipes truncatus Kawai & Sasa, 1985
- Microtendipes tuberosus Qi & Wang, 2006
- Microtendipes tumulus (Dutta & Chaudhuri, 1995)
- Microtendipes umbrosus Freeman, 1955
- Microtendipes urbanus (Kieffer, 1911)
- Microtendipes wuyiensis Song & Qi, 2023
- Microtendipes yaanensis Qi & Wang, 2006
- Microtendipes zhamensis Qi & Wang, 2006
- Microtendipes zhejiangensis Qi, Lin & Wang, 2012
- † Microtendipes eocenicus Doitteau & Nel, 2007
- † Microtendipes melainus Hong, 1981
