= Rheotanytarsus =

Scientific classification
- Kingdom: Animalia
- Phylum: Arthropoda
- Class: Insecta
- Order: Diptera
- Family: Chironomidae
- Subfamily: Chironominae
- Genus: Rheotanytarsus; Thienemann & Bause, 1913

Species
- †Rheotanytarsus lacustris

Genus of flies

Rheotanytarsus is a genus of European non-biting midges in the subfamily Chironominae of the bloodworm family Chironomidae.
