= Lipiniella =

Scientific classification
- Kingdom: Animalia
- Phylum: Arthropoda
- Clade: Pancrustacea
- Class: Insecta
- Order: Diptera
- Family: Chironomidae
- Subfamily: Chironominae
- Tribe: Chironomini
- Genus: Lipiniella; Shilova, 1961

Genus of non-biting midges

Lipiniella is a genus of non-biting midges in the family Chironomidae. There are at least four described species in Lipiniella.

== Species ==
These four species belong to the genus Lipiniella:

- Lipiniella araenicola Shilova, 1961
- Lipiniella moderata Kalugina, 1970
- Lipiniella prima Shilova, Kerkis & Kiknadze, 1992
- Lipiniella secunda Shilova & Proviz, 1997
