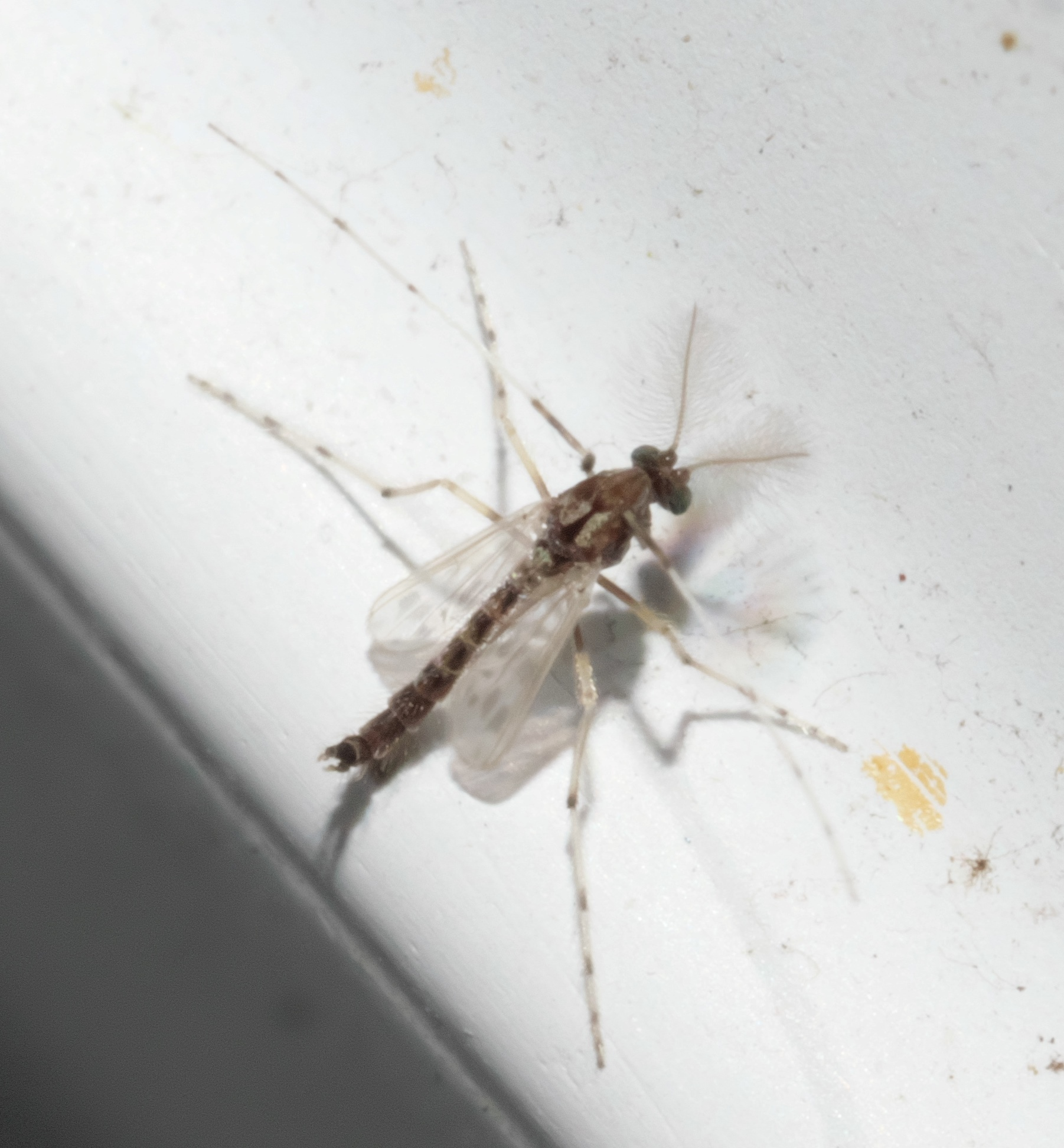
- Zavreliella marmorata, Oklahoma

Scientific classification
- Kingdom: Animalia
- Phylum: Arthropoda
- Clade: Pancrustacea
- Class: Insecta
- Order: Diptera
- Family: Chironomidae
- Subfamily: Chironominae
- Tribe: Chironomini
- Genus: Zavreliella; Kieffer, 1920

= Zavreliella =

Genus of flies

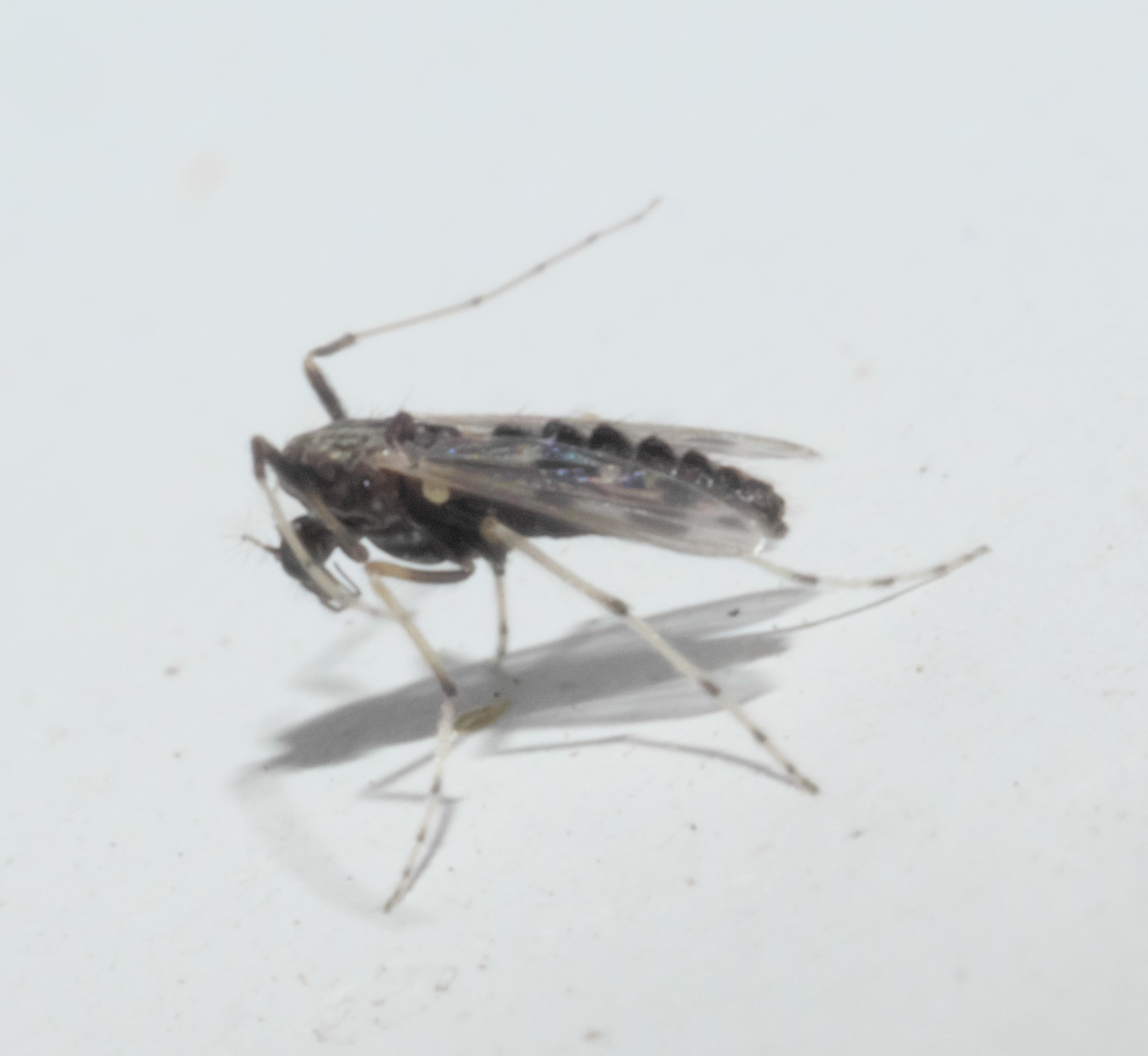
Zavreliella marmorata, Oklahoma

Zavreliella is a genus of nonbiting midges in the family Chironomidae. There are about 17 described species in Zavreliella, found worldwide. The genus is named in honour of Jan Zavřel.

== Species ==
These 17 species belong to the genus Zavreliella:

- Zavreliella acuta Reiss, 1990
- Zavreliella brauni Reiss, 1990
- Zavreliella cranstoni Reiss, 1990
- Zavreliella curta Reiss, 1990
- Zavreliella fittkaui Reiss, 1990
- Zavreliella furcata Reiss, 1990
- Zavreliella inawaheia Sasa, Kitami & Suzuki, 2001
- Zavreliella junki Reiss, 1990
- Zavreliella kambeba Fusari, Pinho & Lamas, 2017
- Zavreliella lata Reiss, 1990
- Zavreliella levis Reiss, 1990
- Zavreliella lobata Reiss, 1990
- Zavreliella longiseta Reiss, 1990
- Zavreliella marmorata (Wulp, 1858)
- Zavreliella molesta Reiss, 1990
- Zavreliella shidai Cao & Tang, 2017
- Zavreliella verrucosa Reiss, 1990
