= Xenochironomus =

Scientific classification
- Kingdom: Animalia
- Phylum: Arthropoda
- Clade: Pancrustacea
- Class: Insecta
- Order: Diptera
- Family: Chironomidae
- Subfamily: Chironominae
- Genus: Xenochironomus; Kieffer, 1921

Genus of non-biting midges

Xenochironomus is a genus of nonbiting midges in the family Chironomidae. There are about 13 described species in Xenochironomus.

== Species ==
These 13 species belong to the genus Xenochironomus:

- Xenochironomus canterburyensis (Freeman, 1959)
- Xenochironomus ceciliae Roque & Trivinho-Strixino, 2005
- Xenochironomus glaber Yu & Wang, 2010
- Xenochironomus hexataeniorhynchus Ree, 2009
- Xenochironomus jungorum Albu, 1980
- Xenochironomus lacertus Dutta & Chaudhuri, 1995
- Xenochironomus nigricaudus Hashimoto, 1981
- Xenochironomus rotunda Mukherjee, Ghosh, Ray, Naskar & Banerjee, 2025
- Xenochironomus trisetosus (Kieffer, 1922)
- Xenochironomus trochanteratus (Thomson, 1869)
- Xenochironomus tuberosus Wang, 2000
- Xenochironomus ugandae (Goetghebuer, 1936)
- Xenochironomus xenolabis (Kieffer, 1916)
