= Graceus =

Scientific classification
- Kingdom: Animalia
- Phylum: Arthropoda
- Clade: Pancrustacea
- Class: Insecta
- Order: Diptera
- Family: Chironomidae
- Tribe: Chironomini
- Genus: Graceus; Goetghebuer, 1928
- Species: G. ambiguus

Binomial name
- Graceus ambiguus Goetghebuer, 1928

Genus of non-biting midges

Graceus is a genus of non-biting midges in the family Chironomidae. This genus has a single species, Graceus ambiguus.
