= Zavrelia =

Scientific classification
- Kingdom: Animalia
- Phylum: Arthropoda
- Clade: Pancrustacea
- Class: Insecta
- Order: Diptera
- Family: Chironomidae
- Tribe: Tanytarsini
- Genus: Zavrelia; Kieffer, Thienemann & Bause in Bause, 1913

Type species
- Zavrelia pentatoma Kieffer & Bause in Bause, 1914

Genus of flies

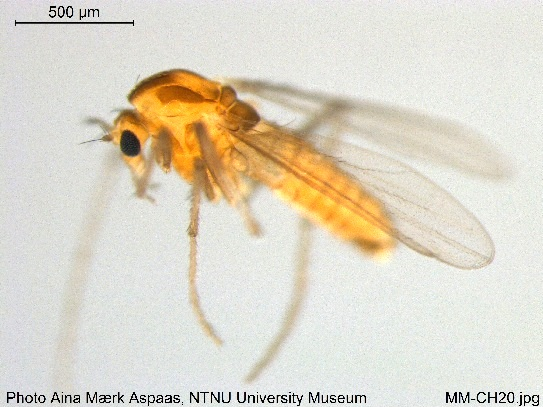
Zavrelia pentatoma MM-CH20+1574356208.

Zavrelia is a genus of European non-biting midges in the subfamily Chironominae of the bloodworm family Chironomidae. The genus is named in honour of Jan Zavřel.

Species of the genus are small to minute chironomids, which are recorded from both continents of the northern hemisphere. All known larvae of Zavrelia construct small, straight transportable cases of sand, silt, detritus and sometimes diatoms that function as retreats until the mature pupa swims to the surface prior to its adult emergence.

== Species ==
- Z. aristata Torbjørn & Stur, 2009
- Z. casasi Torbjørn & Stur, 2009
- Z. clinovolsella Guo & Wang, 2004
- Z. hudsoni Torbjørn & Stur, 2009
- Z. pentatoma Kieffer & Bause in Bause, 1914
- Z. sinica Torbjørn & Stur, 2009
- Z. tusimatijea (Sasa & Suzuki, 1999)
