= Microchironomus =

Scientific classification
- Kingdom: Animalia
- Phylum: Arthropoda
- Clade: Pancrustacea
- Class: Insecta
- Order: Diptera
- Family: Chironomidae
- Tribe: Chironomini
- Genus: Microchironomus; Kieffer, 1921

Type species
- Chironomus (Microchironomus) lendli Kieffer, 1918

Subgenera
- Cryptochironomus; Microchironomus

Synonyms
- Leptochironomus Pagast, 1931

Genus of non-biting midges

Microchironomus is a genus of non-biting midges in the family Chironomidae. There are about 17 described species in Microchironomus, found on every continent except Antarctica.

== Species ==
These 17 species belong to the genus Microchironomus:

- Microchironomus brochus Yan, Saether, Jin & Wang, 2008
- Microchironomus cavus Yan & Wang, 2006
- Microchironomus conjungens Lenz, 1926
- Microchironomus deribae (Freeman, 1957)
- Microchironomus fuscitarsus (Guha & Chaudhuri, 1979)
- Microchironomus ishii Sasa, 1987
- Microchironomus lacteipennis (Kieffer, 1921)
- Microchironomus lendli (Kieffer, 1918)
- Microchironomus magnifrons Kieffer, 1926
- Microchironomus nigrovittatus (Malloch, 1915)
- Microchironomus oblanceolata Maheshwari & Agarwal, 1993
- Microchironomus stilifer (Freeman, 1954)
- Microchironomus superatus (Kieffer, 1922)
- Microchironomus tabarui Sasa, 1987
- Microchironomus tener (Kieffer, 1918)
- Microchironomus teruyai Sasa, 1991
- Microchironomus trisetifer Hashimoto, 1981
