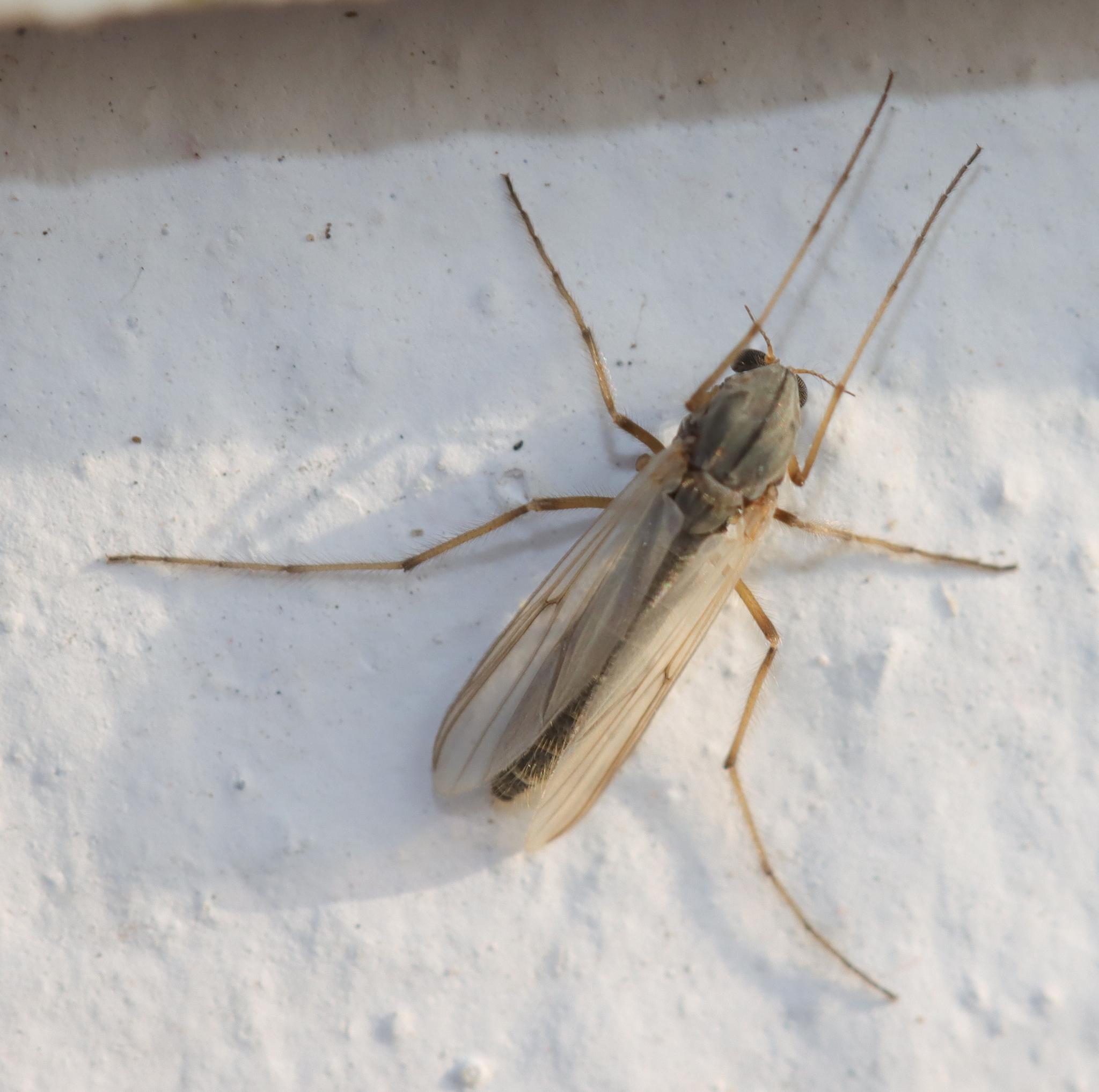
- Baeotendipes, South Africa

Scientific classification
- Kingdom: Animalia
- Phylum: Arthropoda
- Clade: Pancrustacea
- Class: Insecta
- Order: Diptera
- Family: Chironomidae
- Tribe: Chironomini
- Genus: Baeotendipes; Kieffer, 1913
- Species: B. noctivagus

Binomial name
- Baeotendipes noctivagus (Kieffer, 1911)

= Baeotendipes =

Genus of non-biting midges

Baeotendipes is a genus of non-biting midges in the family Chironomidae. This genus has a single species, Baeotendipes noctivagus, found in southern Europe and Africa. The larvae live in the sediment of saline lakes.
