= Paralauterborniella =

Scientific classification
- Kingdom: Animalia
- Phylum: Arthropoda
- Class: Insecta
- Order: Diptera
- Family: Chironomidae
- Subfamily: Chironominae
- Genus: Paralauterborniella; Lenz, 1941

Type species
- Chironomus nigrohalteralis Malloch, 1915

Genus of non-biting midges

Paralauterborniella is a genus of non-biting midges in the subfamily Chironominae of the bloodworm family Chironomidae. Apedilum was formerly considered a junior synonym of this genus, but was restored as a separate genus by J. H. Epler (1988) for the species A. elachistus and A. subcinctum.

== Species ==
These three species belong to the genus Paralauterborniella:

- Paralauterborniella ershanensis Tang, 2012
- Paralauterborniella manii (Maheshwari & Maheshwari, 2002)
- Paralauterborniella nigrohalteralis (Malloch, 1915)
