= Nilothauma =

Scientific classification
- Kingdom: Animalia
- Phylum: Arthropoda
- Class: Insecta
- Order: Diptera
- Family: Chironomidae
- Subfamily: Chironominae
- Genus: Nilothauma; Kieffer, 1921

Synonyms
- Tosayusurika Sasa, Suzuki & Sakai, 1998

Genus of non-biting midges

Nilothauma is a genus of nonbiting midges in the family Chironomidae. There are more than 60 described species in Nilothauma.

== Species ==
These 66 species belong to the genus Nilothauma:

- Nilothauma acre Adam & Saether, 1999
- Nilothauma adunatum Adam & Saether, 1999
- Nilothauma aleta Roback, 1960
- Nilothauma amazonense Mendes & Andersen, 2009
- Nilothauma anamariae Dantas & Hamada, 2017
- Nilothauma anderseni Adam & Saether, 1999
- Nilothauma angustum Qi, Tang & Wang, 2016
- Nilothauma ankasense Adam & Saether, 1999
- Nilothauma aripuanense Mendes & Andersen, 2009
- Nilothauma aristatum Qi, Tang & Wang, 2016
- Nilothauma babiyi (Rempel, 1937)
- Nilothauma bicorne (Townes, 1945)
- Nilothauma bilobatum Qi, Tang & Wang, 2016
- Nilothauma brayi (Goetghebuer, 1921)
- Nilothauma burmeisteri Adam & Saether, 1999
- Nilothauma calori Mendes & Andersen, 2009
- Nilothauma canaima Andersen, Bello-González & Hagenlund, 2016
- Nilothauma complicatum Mendes & Andersen, 2009
- Nilothauma duena Roback, 1960
- Nilothauma duminola Adam & Saether, 1999
- Nilothauma fazzariense Mendes & Andersen, 2009
- Nilothauma fittkaui (Soponis, 1987)
- Nilothauma flabellatum Adam & Saether, 1999
- Nilothauma fuscina Adam & Saether, 1999
- Nilothauma granma Andersen, Bello-González & Hagenlund, 2016
- Nilothauma hamadae Pinho & Andersen, 2021
- Nilothauma harrisoni Adam & Saether, 1999
- Nilothauma hibaraquarta Sasa, 1993
- Nilothauma hibaratertium Sasa, 1993
- Nilothauma inca Dantas & Hamada, 2024
- Nilothauma infissum Adam & Saether, 1999
- Nilothauma insolitum Adam & Saether, 1999
- Nilothauma involucrum Mendes & Andersen, 2009
- Nilothauma japonicum Niitsuma, 1985
- Nilothauma jaquei Dantas & Hamada, 2017
- Nilothauma jaraguaense Mendes & Andersen, 2009
- Nilothauma jupau Pinho & Andersen, 2021
- Nilothauma kakumense Adam & Saether, 1999
- Nilothauma karitiana Pinho & Andersen, 2021
- Nilothauma latocaudatum Adam & Saether, 1999
- Nilothauma leccii Pinho & Andersen, 2021
- Nilothauma marianoi Pinho & Andersen, 2021
- Nilothauma mateusi Pinho & Andersen, 2021
- Nilothauma matogrossense Mendes & Andersen, 2009
- Nilothauma maya Pinho & Andersen, 2021
- Nilothauma mergae Adam & Saether, 1999
- Nilothauma mirabile (Townes, 1945)
- Nilothauma niidaense Niitsuma, 2016
- Nilothauma nojirimaculatum Sasa, 1991
- Nilothauma pandum Qi, Lin, Wang & Shao, 2014
- Nilothauma paucisetis Dantas & Hamada, 2017
- Nilothauma pictipenne Kieffer, 1927
- Nilothauma quatuorlobum Yan, Tang & Wang, 2005
- Nilothauma roquei Mendes & Andersen, 2009
- Nilothauma sasai Adam & Saether, 1999
- Nilothauma soka Andersen, Bello-González & Hagenlund, 2016
- Nilothauma sooretamense Mendes & Andersen, 2009
- Nilothauma spiesi Mendes & Andersen, 2009
- Nilothauma strebulosa (Adam & Saether, 2000)
- Nilothauma terena Pinho & Andersen, 2021
- Nilothauma txukuyana Pinho & Andersen, 2021
- Nilothauma uatuma Dantas & Hamada, 2024
- Nilothauma verrucum Adam & Saether, 1999
- Nilothauma werekena Pinho & Andersen, 2021
- Nilothauma yekwana Pinho & Andersen, 2021
- Nilothauma zitoi Mendes & Andersen, 2009
