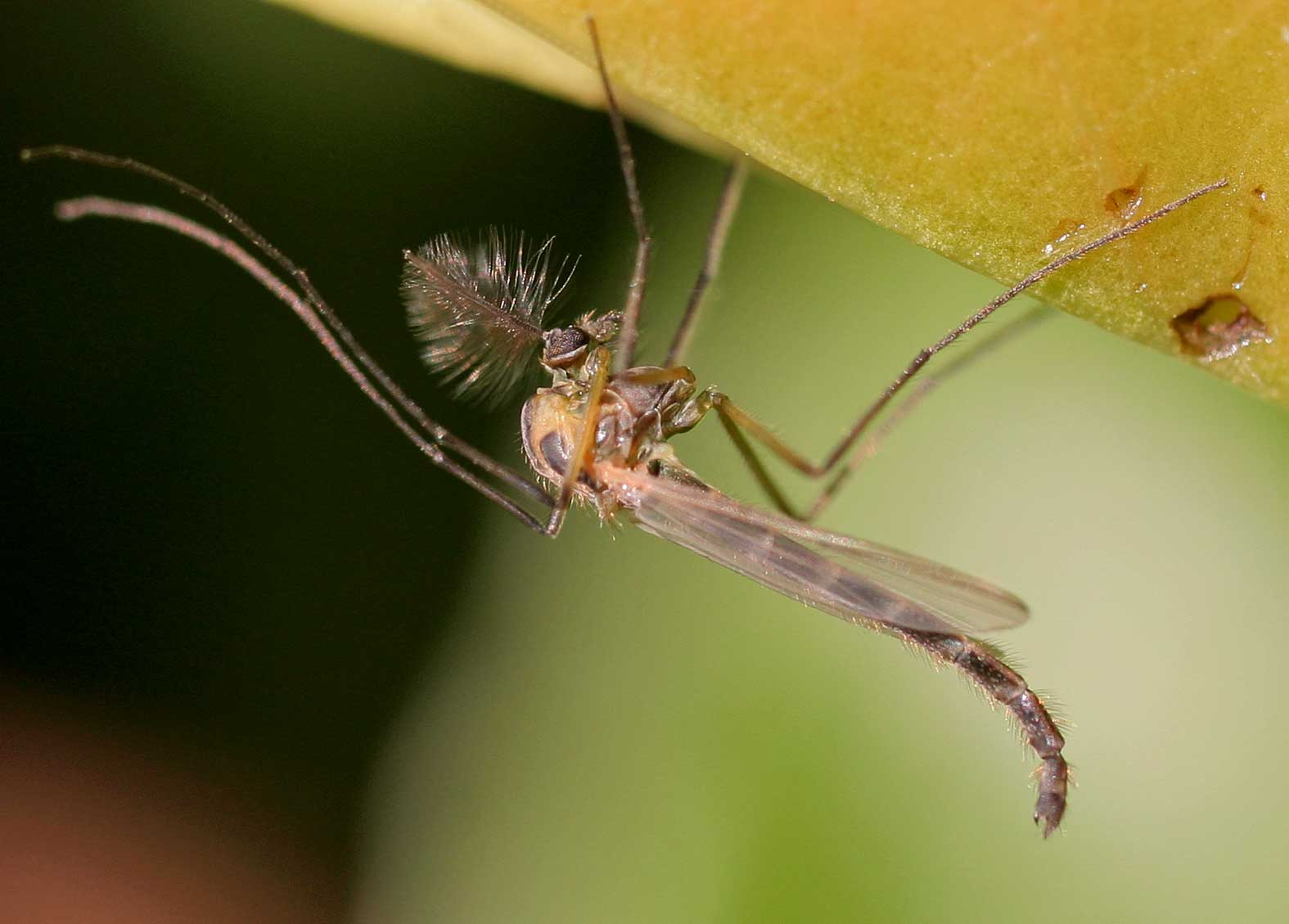
- Chironomus plumosus Adult male

Scientific classification
- Kingdom: Animalia
- Phylum: Arthropoda
- Clade: Pancrustacea
- Class: Insecta
- Order: Diptera
- Family: Chironomidae
- Subfamily: Chironominae

Tribes
- Chironomini; Pseudochironomini; Tanytarsini

= Chironominae =

Subfamily of flies

Chironominae is a subfamily of midges in the non-biting midge family (Chironomidae).

== Genera ==
- Tribe Chironomini
  - Axarus Roback 1980
  - Baeotendipes Kieffer, 1913
  - Beckidia Sæther 1979
  - Carbochironomus Reiss & Kirschbaum 1990
  - Chernovskiia Sæther 1977
  - Chironomus Meigen, 1803
  - Cladopelma Kieffer, 1921
  - Cryptochironomus Kieffer, 1918
  - Cryptotendipes Lenz, 1941
  - Demeijerea Kruseman, 1933
  - Demicryptochironomus Lenz, 1941
  - Dicrotendipes Kieffer, 1913
  - Einfeldia Kieffer, 1924
  - Endochironomus Kieffer, 1918
  - Glyptotendipes Kieffer, 1913
  - Graceus Goetghebuer, 1928
  - Harnischia Kieffer, 1921
  - Kiefferulus Goetghebuer, 1922
  - Kloosia Kruseman 1933
  - Lipiniella Shilova 1961
  - Lauterborniella Thienemann & Bause, 1913
  - Microchironomus Kieffer, 1918
  - Microtendipes Kieffer, 1915
  - Nilothauma Kieffer, 1921
  - Omisus Townes, 1945
  - Pagastiella Brundin, 1949
  - Parachironomus Lenz, 1921
  - Paracladopelma Harnisch, 1923
  - Paralauterborniella Lenz, 1941
  - Paratendipes Kieffer, 1911
  - Phaenopsectra Kieffer, 1921
  - Polypedilum Kieffer, 1912
  - Saetheria Jackson, 1977
  - Sergentia Kieffer, 1922
  - Stenochironomus Kieffer, 1919
  - Stictochironomus Kieffer, 1919
  - Synendotendipes Grodhaus, 1987
  - Tribelos Townes, 1945
  - Xenochironomus Kieffer, 1921
  - Zavreliella Kieffer, 1920
- Tribe Pseudochironomini
  - Pseudochironomus Malloch, 1915
- Tribe Tanytarsini
  - Afrozavrelia Harrison, 2004
  - Cladotanytarsus Kieffer, 1921
  - Corynocera Zetterstedt, 1838
  - Micropsectra Kieffer, 1909
  - Neozavrelia Goetghebuer, 1941
  - Parapsectra Reiss, 1969
  - Paratanytarsus Thienemann & Bause, 1913
  - Rheotanytarsus Thienemann & Bause, 1913
  - Stempellina Thienemann & Bause, 1913
  - Stempellinella Brundin, 1947
  - Tanytarsus van der Wulp, 1874
  - Virgatanytarsus Pinder, 1982
  - Zavrelia Kieffer, 1913
