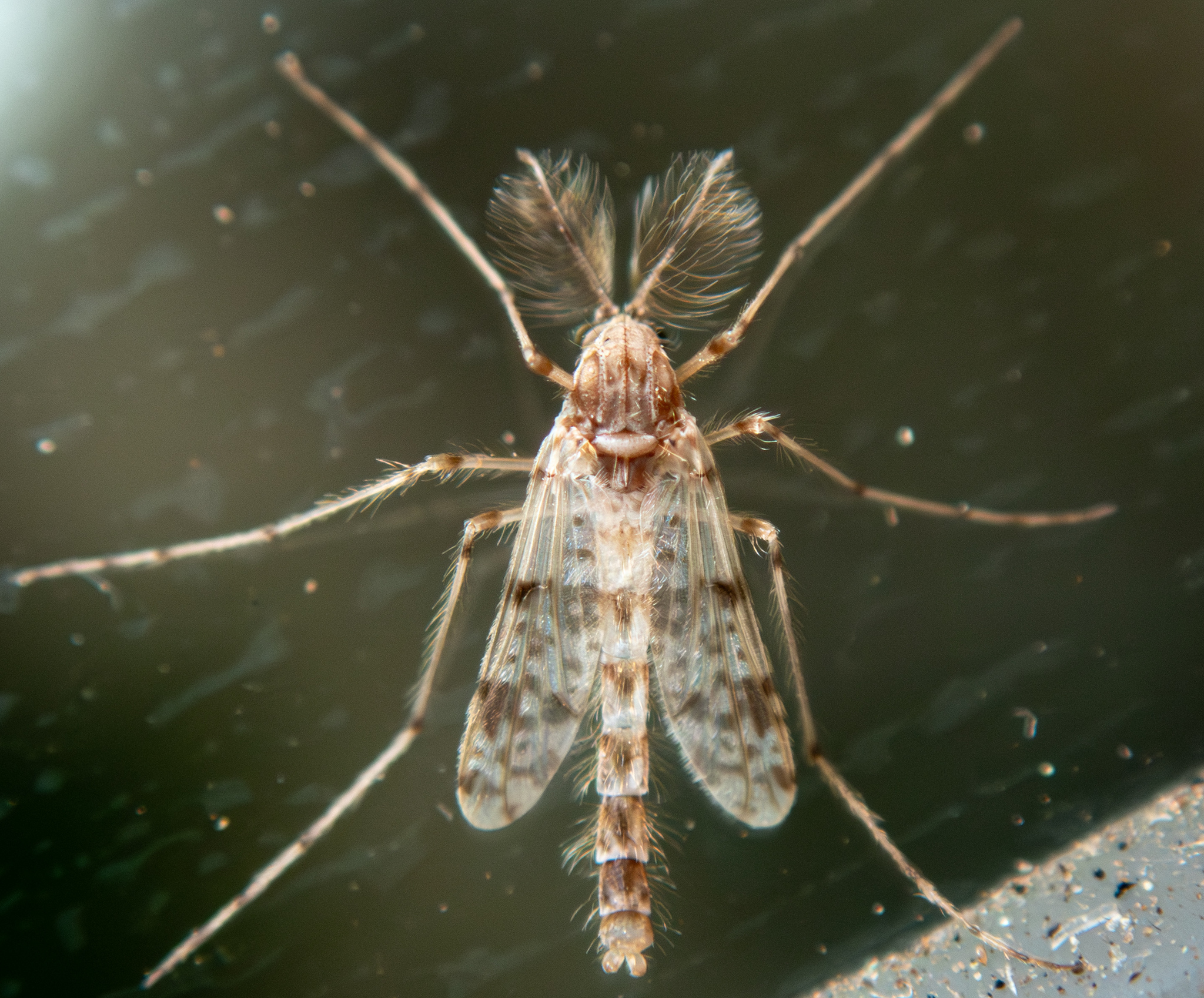

Scientific classification
- Kingdom: Animalia
- Phylum: Arthropoda
- Class: Insecta
- Order: Diptera
- Family: Chironomidae
- Genus: Thienemannimyia
- Species: T. barberi

Binomial name
- Thienemannimyia barberi (Coquillett, 1902)

Synonyms
- Synonymy: Tanypus barberi Coquillett, 1902; Conchapelopia sp. Roback, 1981

= Thienemannimyia barberi =

Species of insect

Thienemannimyia barberi is a species of non-biting midge in the subfamily Tanypodinae of the bloodworm family Chironomidae, found in the western United States and Mexico.

== Taxonomy ==
Thienemannimyia barberi was formally described in 1902 by American entomologist Daniel William Coquillett. He placed it in the genus Tanypus and coined the binomial name Tanypus barberi. Coquillett based his description on five specimens collected by entomologist Herbert Spencer Barber, for whom he named the species. A pupa of the species was described in 1981 by Selwyn S. Roback, who considered it an unusual member of the genus Conchapelopia; in 1983, after the collection and rearing of more specimens, Roback determined it to have belonged to this species.

== Distribution ==
Thienemannimyia barberi can be found across much of the western United States, and has been recorded in Mexico.

== Ecology ==
Immatures of Thienemannimyia barberi can be found in snags and undercut banks of sandy-bottomed rivers and perennial streams; adults have been collected at light sources near rivers.

Compared to other species within the Pentaneurini, data suggests that Thienemannimyia barberi is more tolerant of relatively extreme environmental conditions, like high air temperatures, high altitude, high water hardness, and high pH.
