= Djalmabatista =

Scientific classification
- Domain: Eukaryota
- Kingdom: Animalia
- Phylum: Arthropoda
- Class: Insecta
- Order: Diptera
- Family: Chironomidae
- Subfamily: Tanypodinae
- Tribe: Procladiini
- Genus: Djalmabatista; Fittkau, 1968

Genus of flies

Djalmabatista is a genus of midges in the family Chironomidae. There are about 14 described species in Djalmabatista.

== Species ==
These 14 species belong to the genus Djalmabatista:

- Djalmabatista amancii Fittkau, 1968
- Djalmabatista antonii Fittkau, 1968
- Djalmabatista dellomei Fittkau, 1968
- Djalmabatista director Fittkau, 1968
- Djalmabatista ivanyae Fittkau, 1968
- Djalmabatista lacustris Paggi, 1985
- Djalmabatista maillardi Doitteau & Nel, 2007
- Djalmabatista orlandoi Oliveira & Carraro, 1997
- Djalmabatista patamona
- Djalmabatista pulcher (Johannsen, 1908)
- Djalmabatista pulchra (Johannsen, 1908)
- Djalmabatista sinica Liu & Tang, 2017
- Djalmabatista travassosi Carraro, Oliveira & Rego, 1992
- Djalmabatista wapixana
