= Clinotanypodini =

Scientific classification
- Kingdom: Animalia
- Phylum: Arthropoda
- Clade: Pancrustacea
- Class: Insecta
- Order: Diptera
- Family: Chironomidae
- Subfamily: Tanypodinae
- Tribe: Clinotanypodini

Genera
- See text

Tribe of flies

Clinotanypodini is a tribe of midges in the non-biting midge family (Chironomidae). It was traditionally known as Coelotanypodini Fittkau, 1962, but sources such as Fauna Europaea now recognize Clinotanypi Lipina, 1928 as having priority.

== Tribes & genera ==
- Genus Coelotanypus Kieffer, 1913
- Genus Clinotanypus Kieffer, 1913
  - C. nervosus (Meigen, 1818)
