= List of Tanypus species =

This is a list of 108 species in Tanypus, a genus of midges in the family Chironomidae.

== Tanypus species ==
- Tanypus albolineatus (Kieffer, 1910)^{c g}
- Tanypus albus (Kieffer, 1924)^{c g}
- Tanypus beringensis (Müller, 1924)^{c g}
- Tanypus bicoloripennis Kieffer, 1917^{c g}
- Tanypus bilineata (Meigen, 1838)^{c g}
- Tanypus bilobatus (Kieffer, 1910)^{c g}
- Tanypus birmanensis (Kieffer, 1913)^{c g}
- Tanypus brevipalpis (Kieffer, 1923)^{c}
- Tanypus brooksi Gerry, 1933^{c g}
- Tanypus bruchi Kieffer, 1925^{c g}
- Tanypus castellanus (Strobl, 1900)^{c g}
- Tanypus catemaco (Roback, 1964)^{c g}
- Tanypus chinensis Wang, 1994^{c g}
- Tanypus ciliatus (Meigen, 1838)^{c g}
- Tanypus cirratus Kieffer, 1925^{c g}
- Tanypus clavatus Beck, 1962^{i c g}
- Tanypus complanatus Saether, 2004^{c g}
- Tanypus concavus Roback, 1971^{i c g}
- Tanypus crassistylus Kieffer, 1925^{c g}
- Tanypus cvaneomaculatus (Doleschall, 1856)^{c g}
- Tanypus debilis (Hutton, 1902)^{c g}
- Tanypus distans (Kieffer, 1909)^{c}
- Tanypus elegantulus (Wulp, 1874)^{c g}
- Tanypus elongatus Kieffer, 1925^{c g}
- Tanypus excavatus Kieffer, 1925^{c g}
- Tanypus faeroensis (Kieffer, 1915)^{c}
- Tanypus fasciatus (Meigen, 1804)^{c}
- Tanypus fiebrigi Kieffer, 1917^{c g}
- Tanypus flaveolus (Williston, 1896)^{c g}
- Tanypus flavidella (Vimmer, 1927)^{c g}
- Tanypus formosanus (Kieffer, 1912)^{c}
- Tanypus fraterculus (Lynch Arribalzaga, 1893)^{c g}
- Tanypus fulvomaculipennis (Vimmer, 1927)^{c g}
- Tanypus fulvonotata (Vimmer, 1927)^{c g}
- Tanypus fusciclava (Kieffer, 1922)^{c}
- Tanypus fuscofemoratus (Roser, 1840)^{c g}
- Tanypus fuscus Freeman, 1955^{c g}
- Tanypus gracilis (Kieffer, 1918)^{c}
- Tanypus gracillima (Kieffer, 1916)^{c g}
- Tanypus grandis Chaudhuri, Das & Debnath, 1985^{c g}
- Tanypus gratus (Meigen, 1838)^{c g}
- Tanypus grodhausi Coquillett, 1905^{b}
- Tanypus guttatipennis Goetghebuer, 1935^{c g}
- Tanypus himalayae (Kieffer, 1911)^{c g}
- Tanypus hirsutus (Macquart, 1826)^{c g}
- Tanypus imperialis Sublette, 1964^{i c g}
- Tanypus incarnatus (Meigen, 1830)^{c g}
- Tanypus kraatzi (Kieffer, 1912)^{c g}
- Tanypus lacustris (Kieffer, 1913)^{c g}
- Tanypus languidus (Hutton, 1902)^{c g}
- Tanypus laticalcar (Kieffer, 1918)^{c g}
- Tanypus lauroi Serpa-Filho & Oliveira, 1922^{c g}
- Tanypus lenzi Spies & Reiss, 1966^{c g}
- Tanypus longiseta (Kieffer, 1924)^{c}
- Tanypus lucidus Chaudhuri, Das & Debnath, 1985^{c g}
- Tanypus luteus (Gimmerthal, 1836)^{c g}
- Tanypus macrochaeta (Kieffer, 1913)^{c g}
- Tanypus maculatus (Macquart, 1826)^{c g}
- Tanypus manilensis (Schiner, 1868)^{c g}
- Tanypus masteri (Skuse, 1889)^{c g}
- Tanypus melanurus (Doleschall, 1856)^{c g}
- Tanypus memorosus (Meigen, 1804)^{c g}
- Tanypus microcercus (Kieffer, 1910)^{c g}
- Tanypus monotomus (Kieffer, 1924)^{c}
- Tanypus murimus (Goetghebuer, 1923)^{c g}
- Tanypus myrmedon Kieffer, 1917^{c g}
- Tanypus nakazatoi ^{g}
- Tanypus neopunctipennis Sublette, 1964^{i c g b}
- Tanypus neotropicus Kieffer, 1917^{c g}
- Tanypus nigristilus (Kieffer, 1915)^{c g}
- Tanypus nigrocinctus (Doleschall, 1856)^{c g}
- Tanypus nubifer Coquillett, 1905^{i c g}
- Tanypus obscurus (Macquart, 1826)^{c g}
- Tanypus pallidicornis (Zetterstedt, 1850)^{c g}
- Tanypus pallidipes (Kieffer, 1912)^{c}
- Tanypus parastellatus Sublette, 1964^{i c g}
- Tanypus pelargus Kieffer, 1917^{c g}
- Tanypus photophilus (Kieffer, 1910)^{c g}
- Tanypus pictipennis (Vimmer, 1927)^{c g}
- Tanypus prionotus (Kieffer, 1924)^{c g}
- Tanypus pubitarsis (Zetterstedt, 1850)^{c}
- Tanypus punctipennis Meigen, 1818^{i c g b}
- Tanypus quadripunctata (Vimmer, 1917)^{c g}
- Tanypus riparius (Kieffer, 1911)^{c g}
- Tanypus rufus (Meigen, 1830)^{c g}
- Tanypus saltatrix (Kieffer, 1911)^{c g}
- Tanypus schineri (Strobl, 1880)^{c g}
- Tanypus scripta (Vimmer, 1917)^{c g}
- Tanypus sexmaculata (Vimmer, 1927)^{c g}
- Tanypus similima (Vimmer, 1927)^{c g}
- Tanypus stellatus Coquillett, 1902^{i c g}
- Tanypus stictolabis (Kieffer, 1923)^{c g}
- Tanypus sylvaticus (Meigen, 1804)^{c g}
- Tanypus tanypodipennis (Zetterstedt, 1838)^{c g}
- Tanypus telus Roback, 1971^{i c g}
- Tanypus tenebrosus Chaudhuri, Das & Debnath, 1985^{c g}
- Tanypus tenuis (Meigen, 1838)^{c g}
- Tanypus tenuistylus Kieffer, 1925^{c g}
- Tanypus transversalis Kieffer, 1925^{c g}
- Tanypus tripunctata (Vimmer, 1927)^{c g}
- Tanypus trisema (Kieffer, 1915)^{c g}
- Tanypus unifascipennis (Zetterstedt, 1838)^{c g}
- Tanypus unimaculata (Macquart, 1826)^{c g}
- Tanypus vilipennis (Kieffer, 1918)^{i c}
- Tanypus villipennis (Kieffer, 1918)^{c g}
- Tanypus violaceipennis (Kieffer, 1910)^{c g}
- Tanypus virdellus (Kieffer, 1924)^{c g}
- Tanypus viridis (Meigen, 1804)^{c g}

Data sources: i = ITIS, c = Catalogue of Life, g = GBIF, b = Bugguide.net
