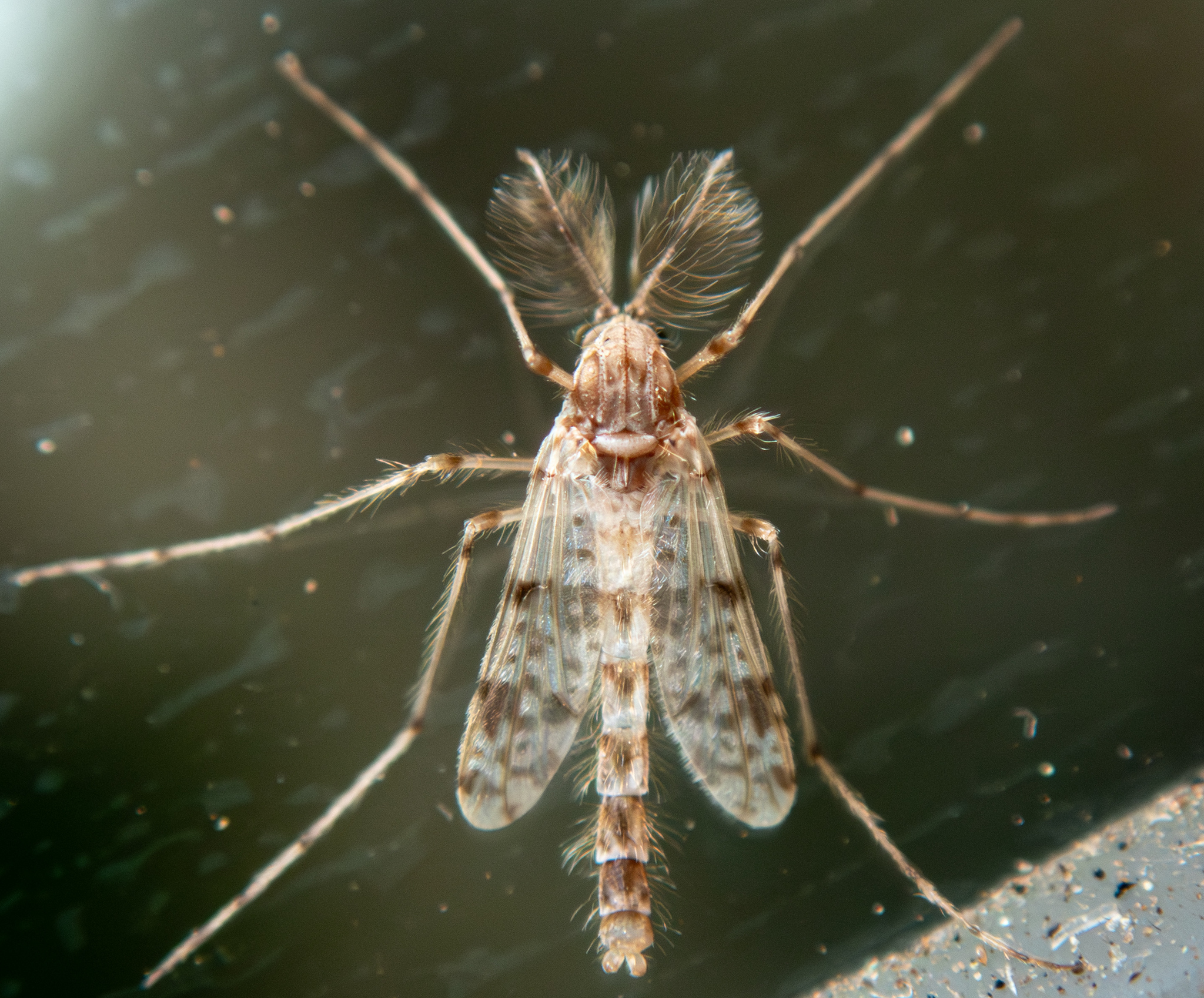
- Thienemannimyia barberi

Scientific classification
- Kingdom: Animalia
- Phylum: Arthropoda
- Clade: Pancrustacea
- Class: Insecta
- Order: Diptera
- Family: Chironomidae
- Subfamily: Tanypodinae
- Tribe: Pentaneurini; Hennig, 1950

Genera
- See text

= Pentaneurini =

Tribe of flies

Pentaneurini is a tribe of midges in the non-biting midge family (Chironomidae).

== Genera & Species ==
- Genus Ablabesmyia Johannsen, 1905

- A. longistyla Fittkau, 1962
- A. monilis (Linnaeus, 1758)
- A. phatta (Egger, 1863)

- Genus Arctopelopia Fittkau, 1962

- A. barbitarsis (Zetterstedt, 1850)
- A. griseipennis (van der Wulp, 1858)
- A. melanosoma (Goetghebuer, 1933)

- Genus Coffmania Hazra & Chaudhuri, 2000

- C. adiecta Hazra & Chaudhuri, 2000
- C. animispina Hazra & Chaudhuri, 2000

- Genus Conchapelopia Fittkau, 1957

- C. aagardi Murray, 1987
- C. melanops (Meigen, 1818)
- C. pallidula (Meigen, 1818)
- C. viator (Kieffer, 1911)

- Genus Guttipelopia Fittkau, 1962

- G. guttipennis (van der Wulp, 1861)

- Genus Hayesomyia Murray & Fittkau, 1985

- H. tripunctata (Goetghebuer, 1922)

- Genus Helopelopia Roback, 1971

- H. cornuticaudata (Walley, 1925)
- H. pilicaudata (Walley, 1925)

- Genus Hudsonimyia Roback, 1979

- H. karelena Roback, 1979
- H. parrishi Caldwell & Soponis, 1982

- Genus Krenopelopia Fittkau, 1962

- K. binotata (Wiedemann, 1817)
- K. nigropunctata (Stæger, 839)

- Genus Labrundinia Fittkau, 1962

- L. longipalpis (Goetghebuer, 1921)

- Genus Larsia Fittkau, 1962

- L. atrocincta (Goetghebuer, 1942)
- L. curticalcar (Kieffer, 1918)

- Genus Monopelopia Fittkau, 1962

- M. tenuicalcar (Kieffer, 1918)

- Genus Nilotanypus Kieffer, 1923

- N. dubius (Meigen, 1804)

- Genus Paramerina Fittkau, 1962

- P. cingulata (Stephens in Walker, 1856), preocc.
- P. divisa (Walker, 1856)

- Genus Rheopelopia Fittkau, 1962

- R. eximia (Edwards, 1929)
- R. maculipennis (Zetterstedt, 838])
- R. ornata (Meigen, 1838)

- Genus Schineriella Murray & Fittkau, 1988

- S. schineri (Strobl, 1880)

- Genus Telmatopelopia Fittkau, 1962

- T. nemorum (Goetghebuer, 1921)

- Genus Thienemannimyia Fittkau, 1957

- T. barberi (Coquillett, 1902)
- T. carnea (Fabricius, 1805)
- T. festiva (Meigen, 1838)
- T. fusciceps (Edwards, 1929)
- T. geijkesi (Goetghebuer, 1934)
- T. laeta (Meigen, 1818)
- T. lentiginosa (Fries, 1823)
- T. northumbrica (Edwards, 1929)
- T. pseudocarnea Murray, 1976
- T. woodi (Edwards, 1929)

- Genus Trissopelopia Kieffer, 1923

- T. longimana (Stæger, 1839)

- Genus Xenopelopia Fittkau, 1962

- X. falcigera (Kieffer, 1911)
- X. nigricans (Goetghebuer, 1927)

- Genus Zavrelimyia Fittkau, 1962

- Z. barbatipes (Kieffer, 1911)
- Z. hirtimana (Kieffer, 1918)
- Z. melanura (Meigen, 1804)
- Z. nubila (Meigen, 1830)
