= Helopelopia =

Scientific classification
- Domain: Eukaryota
- Kingdom: Animalia
- Phylum: Arthropoda
- Class: Insecta
- Order: Diptera
- Family: Chironomidae
- Tribe: Pentaneurini
- Genus: Helopelopia; Roback, 1971

Genus of flies

Helopelopia is a genus of non-biting midges in the subfamily Tanypodinae of the bloodworm family Chironomidae. It was formerly a subgenus of Conchapelopia. This genus is also related to genus Meropelopia.

== Species ==
- H. cornuticaudata (Walley, 1925)
- H. pilicaudata (Walley, 1925)
