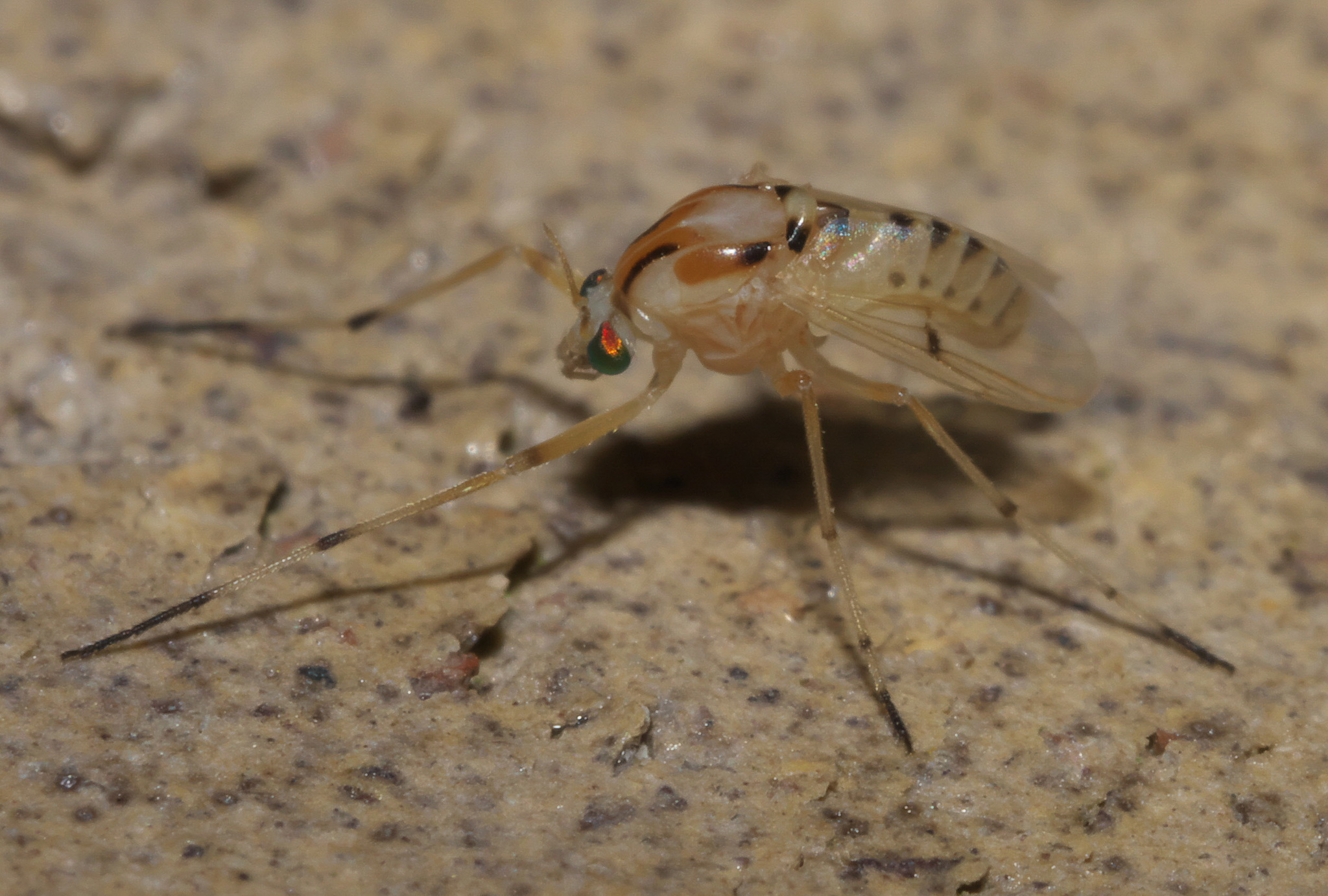
- Coelotanypus concinnus, Arkansas

Scientific classification
- Kingdom: Animalia
- Phylum: Arthropoda
- Class: Insecta
- Order: Diptera
- Family: Chironomidae
- Subfamily: Tanypodinae
- Genus: Coelotanypus
- Species: C. concinnus

Binomial name
- Coelotanypus concinnus (Coquillett, 1895)

Synonyms
- Coelotanypus flavus Kieffer, 1923; Tanypus concinnus Coquillett, 1895

= Coelotanypus concinnus =

Species of fly

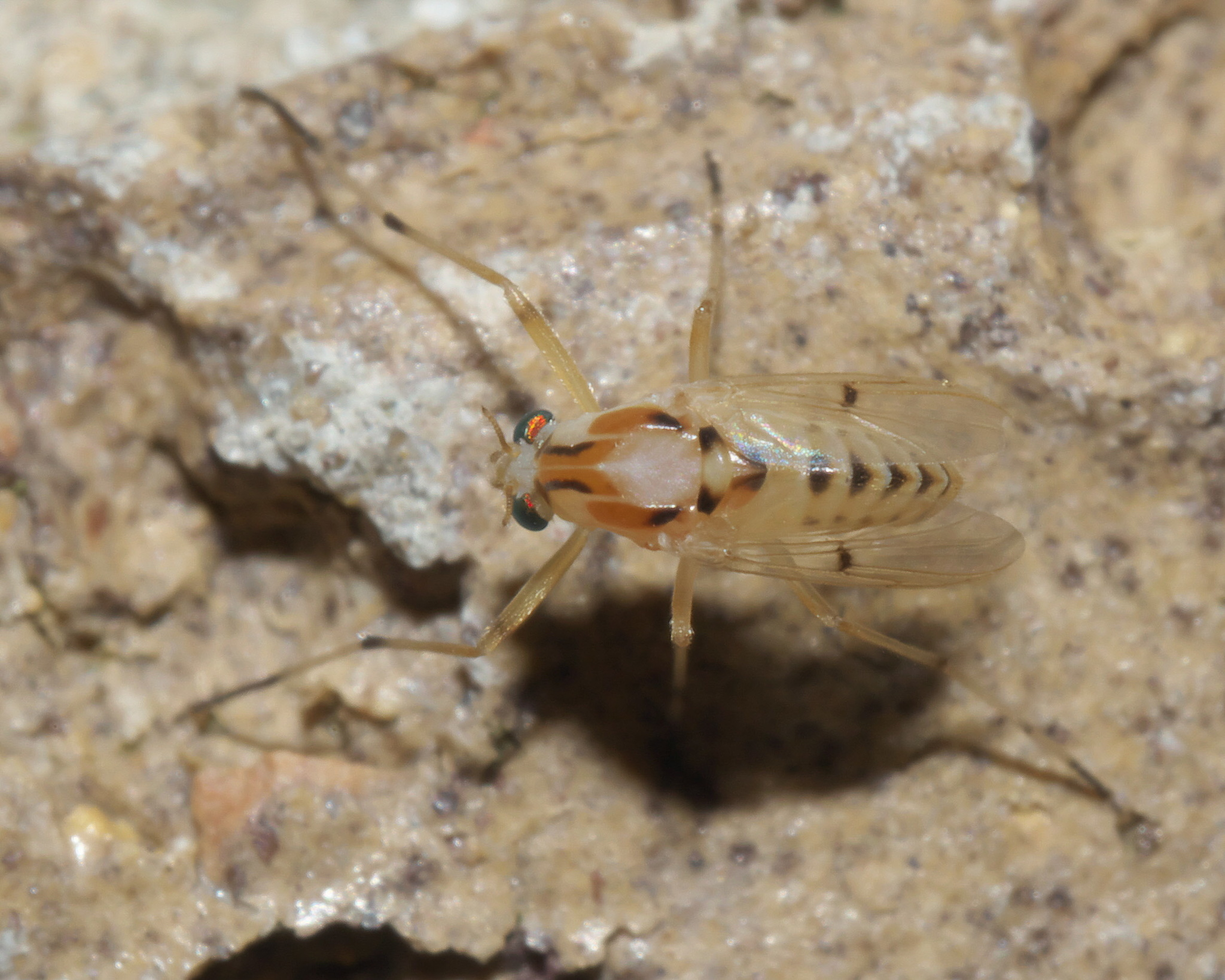
Coelotanypus concinnus, Arkansas

Coelotanypus concinnus is a species of midge in the family Chironomidae. It is found in North America, east of the Rocky Mountains.
