= Djalmabatista pulcher =

Scientific classification
- Domain: Eukaryota
- Kingdom: Animalia
- Phylum: Arthropoda
- Class: Insecta
- Order: Diptera
- Family: Chironomidae
- Tribe: Procladiini
- Genus: Djalmabatista
- Species: D. pulcher

Binomial name
- Djalmabatista pulcher (Johannsen, 1908)

Synonyms
- Procladius maculatus Roback, 1971; Protenthes fasciger Curran, 1930; Protenthes pulcher Johannsen, 1908; Tanypus apicalis Walley, 1926

Species of fly

Djalmabatista pulcher is a species of midge in the family Chironomidae.
