= Hayesomyia =

Scientific classification
- Kingdom: Animalia
- Phylum: Arthropoda
- Clade: Pancrustacea
- Class: Insecta
- Order: Diptera
- Family: Chironomidae
- Tribe: Pentaneurini
- Genus: Hayesomyia; Murray & Fittkau, 1985

Genus of flies

Hayesomyia is a genus of non-biting midges in the subfamily Tanypodinae of the bloodworm family Chironomidae. Some authorities consider Hayesomyia to be a subgenus of Thienemannimyia due to a lack of clearly distinguishing morphological features.
