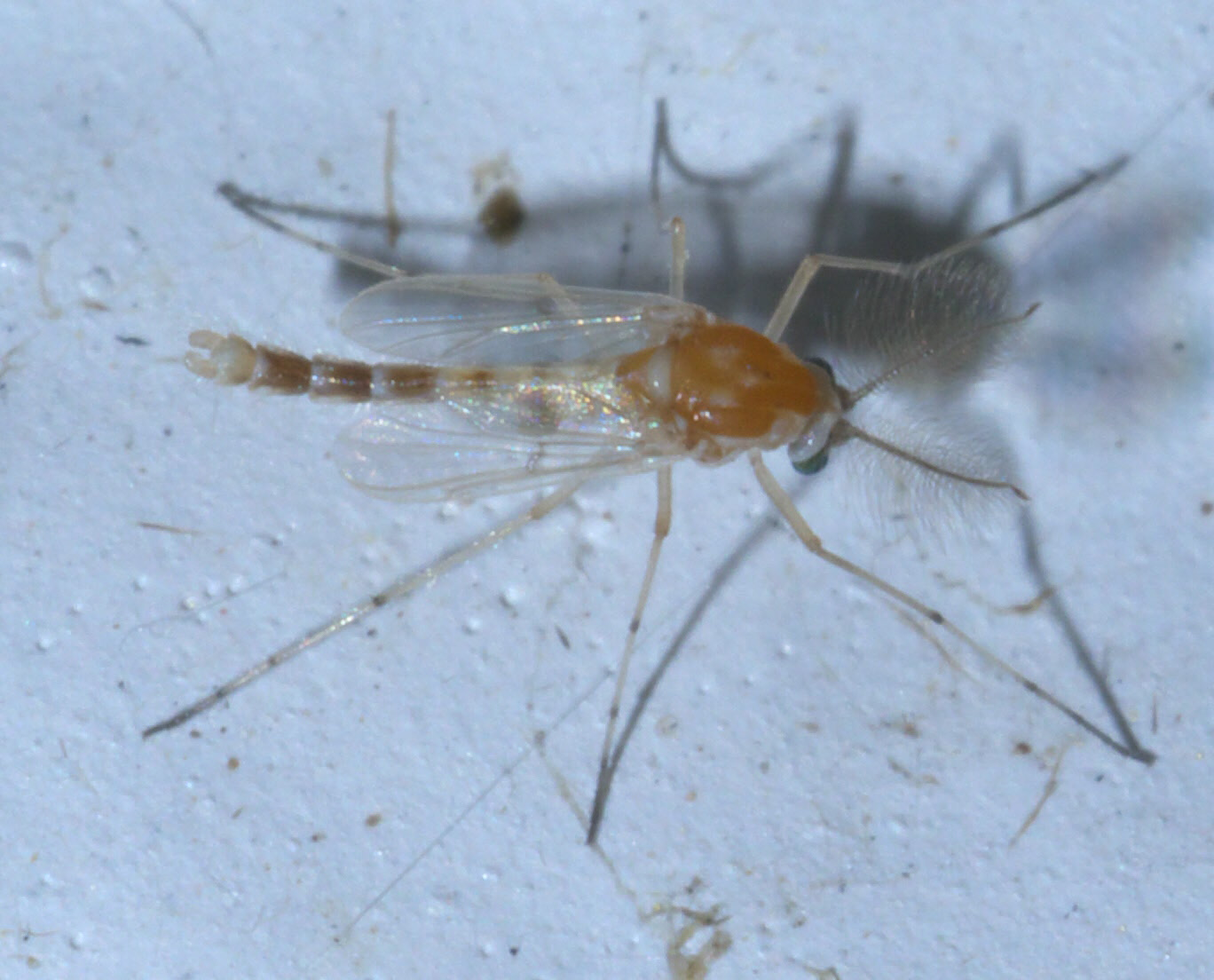

Scientific classification
- Kingdom: Animalia
- Phylum: Arthropoda
- Class: Insecta
- Order: Diptera
- Family: Chironomidae
- Tribe: Procladiini
- Genus: Procladius
- Species: P. bellus

Binomial name
- Procladius bellus (Loew, 1866)

Synonyms
- Procladius adumbratus Johannsen, 1905; Procladius flavidus Kieffer, 1923; Procladius malifero Garrett, 1925; Psilotanypus bellus (Lowe, 1866); Tanypus bellus Loew, 1866; Tanypus pusillus Loew, 1866

= Procladius bellus =

Species of fly

Procladius bellus is a species of midge in the family Chironomidae.

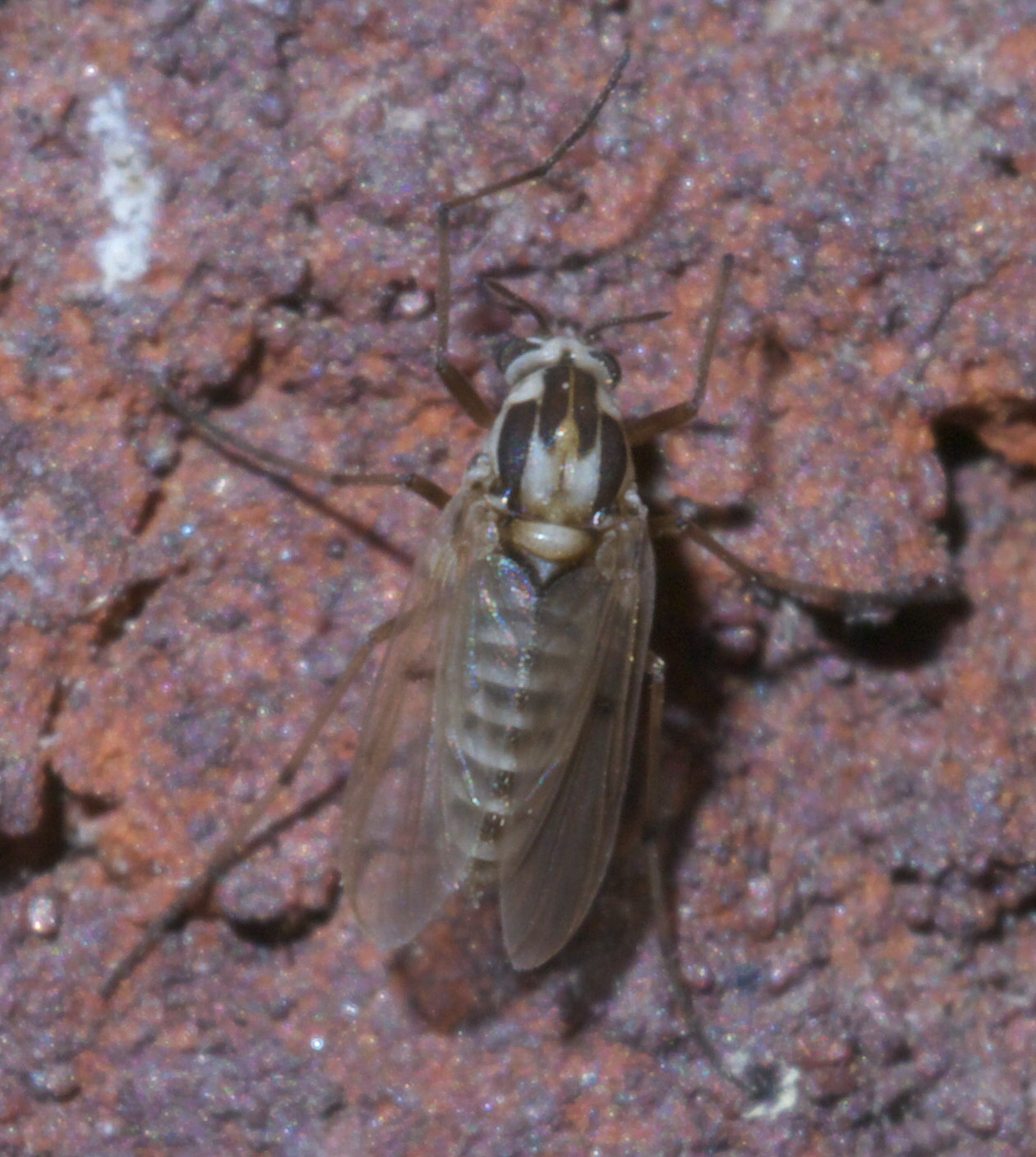

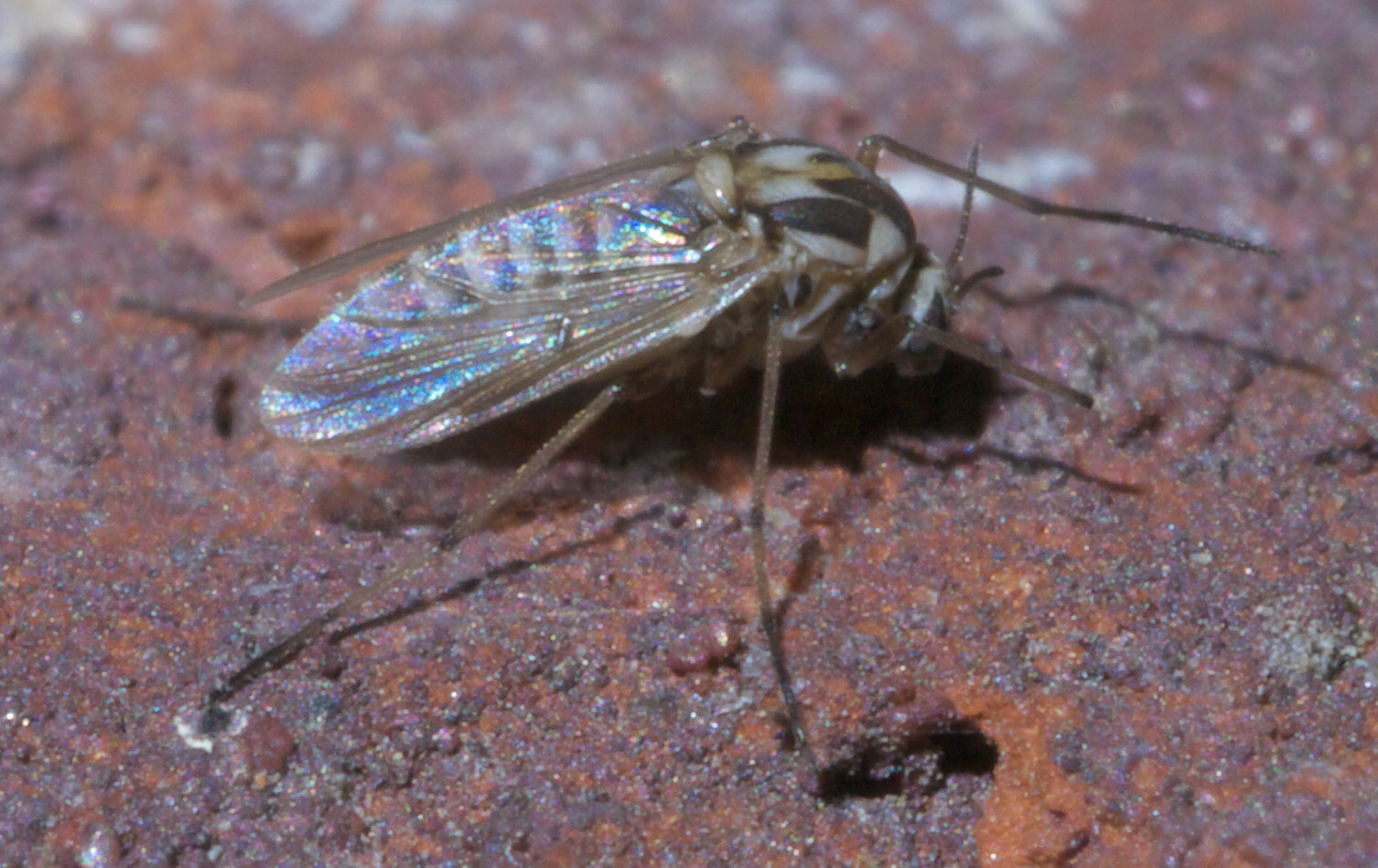
