= Coelotanypus tricolor =

Scientific classification
- Kingdom: Animalia
- Phylum: Arthropoda
- Class: Insecta
- Order: Diptera
- Family: Chironomidae
- Subfamily: Tanypodinae
- Genus: Coelotanypus
- Species: C. tricolor

Binomial name
- Coelotanypus tricolor (Loew, 1861)

Synonyms
- Tanypus tricolor Loew, 1861

Species of fly

Coelotanypus tricolor is a species of midge in the family Chironomidae.
