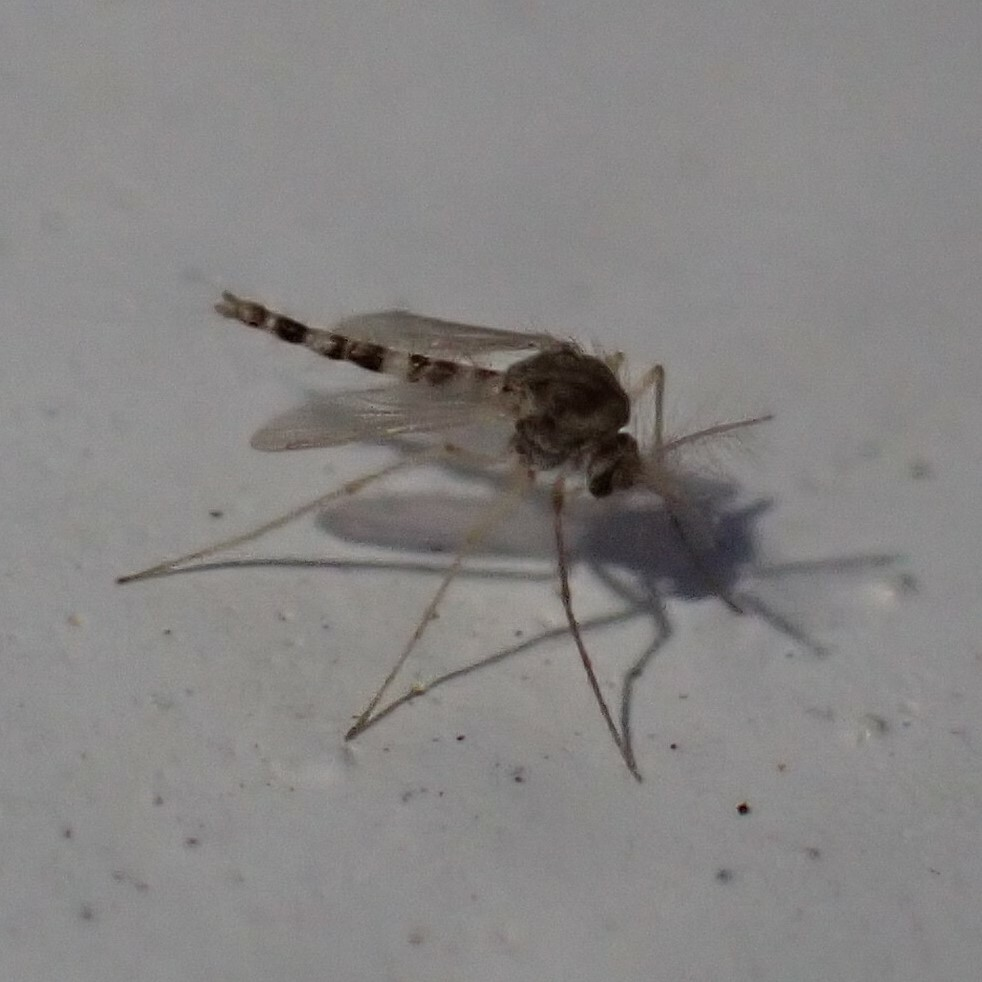
- Labrundinia longipalpis

Scientific classification
- Kingdom: Animalia
- Phylum: Arthropoda
- Class: Insecta
- Order: Diptera
- Family: Chironomidae
- Tribe: Pentaneurini
- Genus: Labrundinia; Fittkau, 1962

= Labrundinia =

Genus of flies

Labrundinia is a genus of non-biting midges in the subfamily Tanypodinae of the bloodworm family Chironomidae.
