= Krenopelopia =

Scientific classification
- Domain: Eukaryota
- Kingdom: Animalia
- Phylum: Arthropoda
- Class: Insecta
- Order: Diptera
- Family: Chironomidae
- Tribe: Pentaneurini
- Genus: Krenopelopia; Fittkau, 1962

Genus of midges

Krenopelopia is a Holarctic genus of the subfamily Tanypodinae of the non-biting midge family Chironomidae.

== Species ==
- Krenopelopia alba Tokunaga, 1937
- Krenopelopia amaminova Sasa, 1991
- Krenopelopia binotata (Wiedemann, 1817)
- Krenopelopia hudsoni Roback, 1983
- Krenopelopia narda Roback, 1971
- Krenopelopia nigropunctata (Sæther, 1839)
- Krenopelopia yunouresia Sasa, 1989
