= Telmatopelopia =

Scientific classification
- Domain: Eukaryota
- Kingdom: Animalia
- Phylum: Arthropoda
- Class: Insecta
- Order: Diptera
- Family: Chironomidae
- Tribe: Pentaneurini
- Genus: Telmatopelopia; Murray & Fittkau, 1988

Genus of flies

Telmatopelopia is a genus of non-biting midges in the subfamily Tanypodinae of the bloodworm family Chironomidae. Females of this genus only have two seminal capsules compared to three in the females of genus Denopelopia.

== Species ==
- Telmatopelopia nemorum - type species
