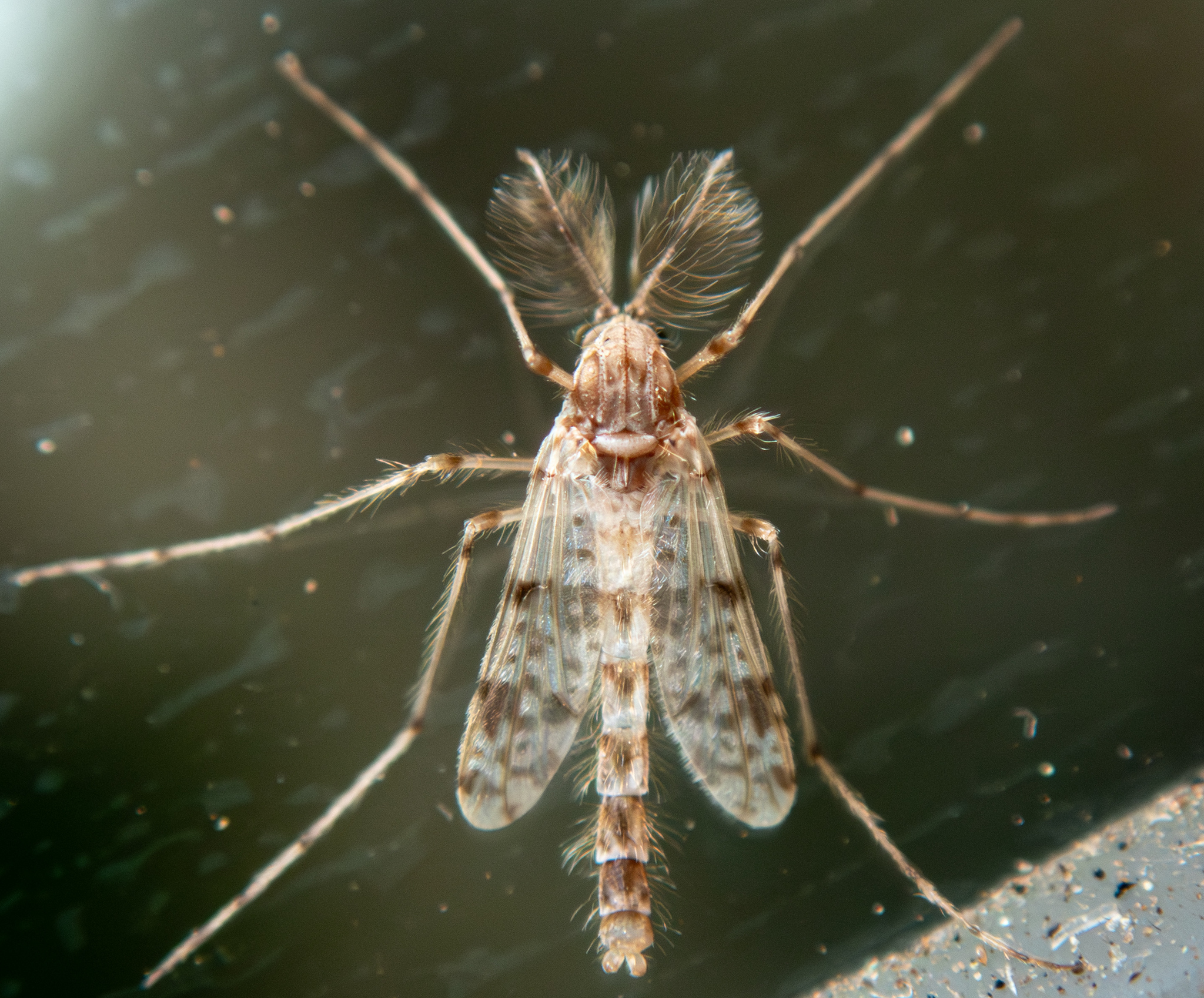
- Thienemannimyia barberi

Scientific classification
- Kingdom: Animalia
- Phylum: Arthropoda
- Clade: Pancrustacea
- Class: Insecta
- Order: Diptera
- Family: Chironomidae
- Tribe: Pentaneurini
- Genus: Thienemannimyia; Fittkau, 1957

= Thienemannimyia =

Genus of flies

Thienemannimyia is a genus of non-biting midges in the subfamily Tanypodinae of the bloodworm family Chironomidae.

== Taxonomy ==
Some authorities consider Hayesomyia to be a subgenus of Thienemannimyia.

=== Species ===
From the Catalogue of Life:

- Thienemannimyia albipes (Fries, 1823)
- Thienemannimyia barberi (Coquillett, 1902)
- Thienemannimyia berkanea Dowling, 1987
- Thienemannimyia carnea (Fabricius, 1805)
- Thienemannimyia choumara Dowling, 1983
- Thienemannimyia dimorpha Cheng & Wang, 2009
- Thienemannimyia festiva (Meigen, 1838)
- Thienemannimyia fusciceps (Edwards, 1929)
- Thienemannimyia galbina Cheng & Wang, 2009
- Thienemannimyia geijeskesi (Goetghebuer, 1934)
- Thienemannimyia incurvata (Goetghebuer, 1921)
- Thienemannimyia johannseni (Kieffer, 1906)
- Thienemannimyia laeta (Meigen, 1818)
- Thienemannimyia lentiginosa (Fries, 1823)
- Thienemannimyia niveiforceps (Kieffer, 1911)
- Thienemannimyia norena (Roback, 1957)
- Thienemannimyia northumbrica (Edwards, 1929)
- Thienemannimyia pseudocarnea Murray, 1976
- Thienemannimyia pseudornata (Goetghebuer, 1921)
- Thienemannimyia senata (Walley, 1925)
- Thienemannimyia sinogalbina Lin & Wang, 2019
- Thienemannimyia tinctoria (Freeman, 1955)
- Thienemannimyia vitellina (Kieffer, 1916)
- Thienemannimyia woodi (Edwards, 1929)
