= Anatopyniini =

Scientific classification
- Kingdom: Animalia
- Phylum: Arthropoda
- Clade: Pancrustacea
- Class: Insecta
- Order: Diptera
- Family: Chironomidae
- Subfamily: Tanypodinae
- Tribe: Anatopyniini

Genera
- see text

Tribe of flies

Anatopyniini is a tribe of midges in the non-biting midge family (Chironomidae).

== Tribes & genera ==
- Genus Anatopynia Johannsen, 1905
  - A. plumipes (Fries, 1823)

== Distribution and ecology ==
At present A. plumipes is the only species of Anatopynia (Johannsen, 1905) known from the Palearctic. They occur in polluted (eutrophic and hypertrophic) standing waters together with Chironomus gr. plumosus. They are large (compared to the larvae of other Tanypodinae) predators that can ingest large prey (such as Ostracods and Chironomus larvae) in one piece.
