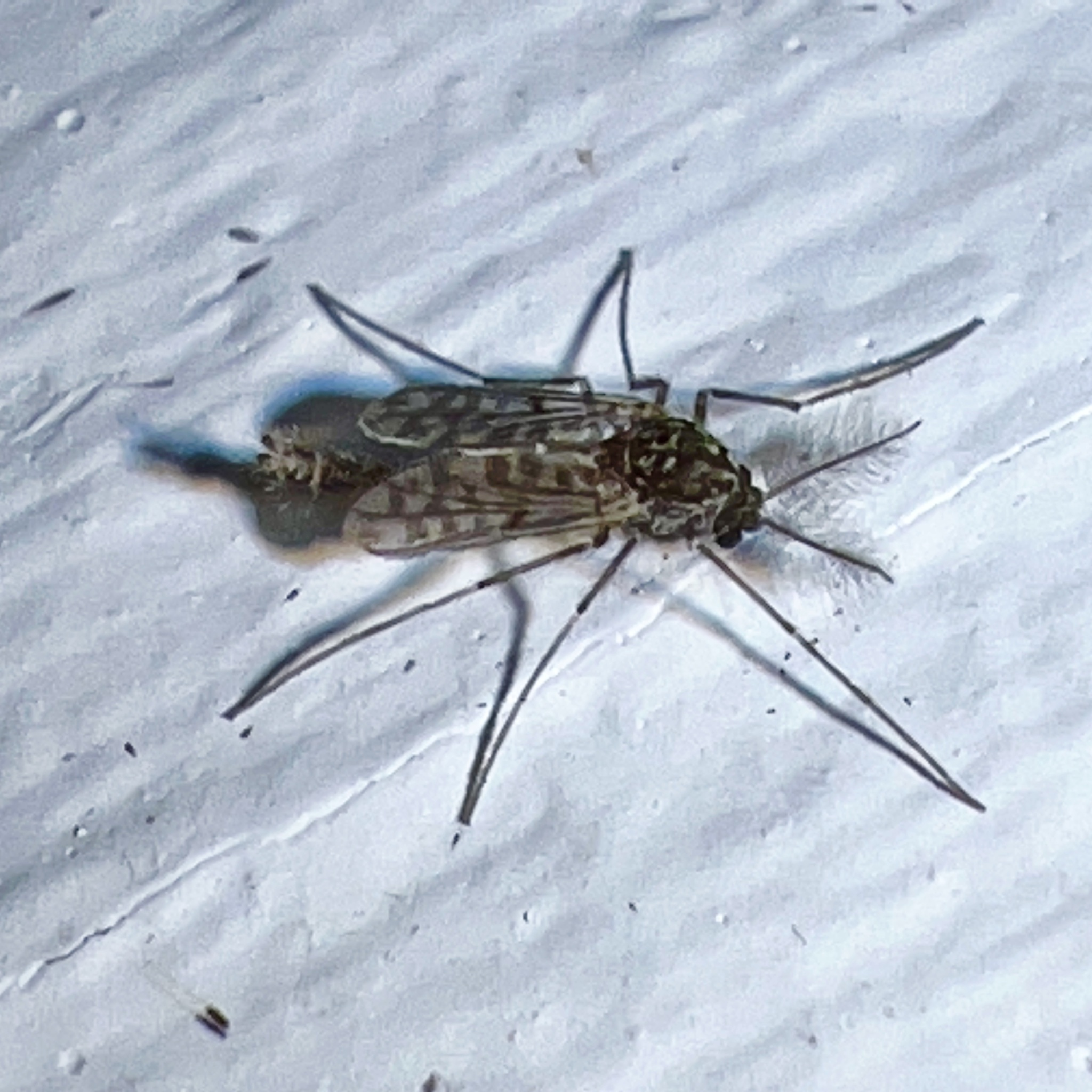
- Guttipelopia guttipennis

Scientific classification
- Kingdom: Animalia
- Phylum: Arthropoda
- Class: Insecta
- Order: Diptera
- Family: Chironomidae
- Tribe: Pentaneurini
- Genus: Guttipelopia; Fittkau, 1962

Species
- see text

= Guttipelopia =

Genus of flies

Guttipelopia is a genus of non-biting midges in the subfamily Tanypodinae of the bloodworm family Chironomidae.

== Species ==
- G. currani Beck & Beck, 1966
- G. guttipennis (Wulp, 1874)
- G. rosenbergi Bilyj, 1984
