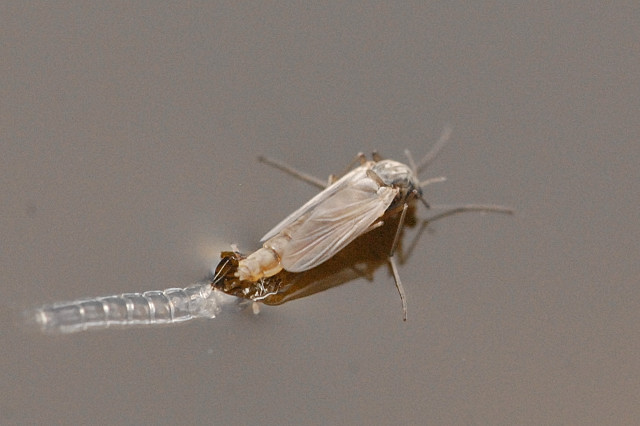
- Natarsia nugax

Scientific classification
- Kingdom: Animalia
- Phylum: Arthropoda
- Class: Insecta
- Order: Diptera
- Family: Chironomidae
- Subfamily: Tanypodinae
- Tribe: Natarsiini; Roback & Moss, 1978
- Genus: Natarsia; Fittkau, 1962

Type species
- Chironomus punctata Fabricius, 1805

Species
- See text

= Natarsia =

Genus of flies

Natarsia is a genus of non-biting midges in the subfamily Tanypodinae of the bloodworm family Chironomidae. It is the only genus in the tribe Natarsiini.

== Species ==
- Natarsia baltimoreus (Macquart, 1855)
- Natarsia fastuosa (Johannsen, 1905)
- Natarsia miripes (Coquillett, 1905)
- Natarsia nugax (Walker, 1856)
- Natarsia punctata (Fabricius, 1805)
- Natarsia qinlingica (Cheng & Wang, 2006)
