= Larsia =

Scientific classification
- Kingdom: Animalia
- Phylum: Arthropoda
- Class: Insecta
- Order: Diptera
- Family: Chironomidae
- Tribe: Pentaneurini
- Genus: Larsia; Fittkau, 1962

Genus of flies

Larsia is a genus of non-biting midges in the subfamily Tanypodinae of the bloodworm family Chironomidae.

== Species ==
- L. atrocincta (Goetghebuer, 1942)
- L. angusticornis
- L. curticalcar (Kieffer, 1918)
