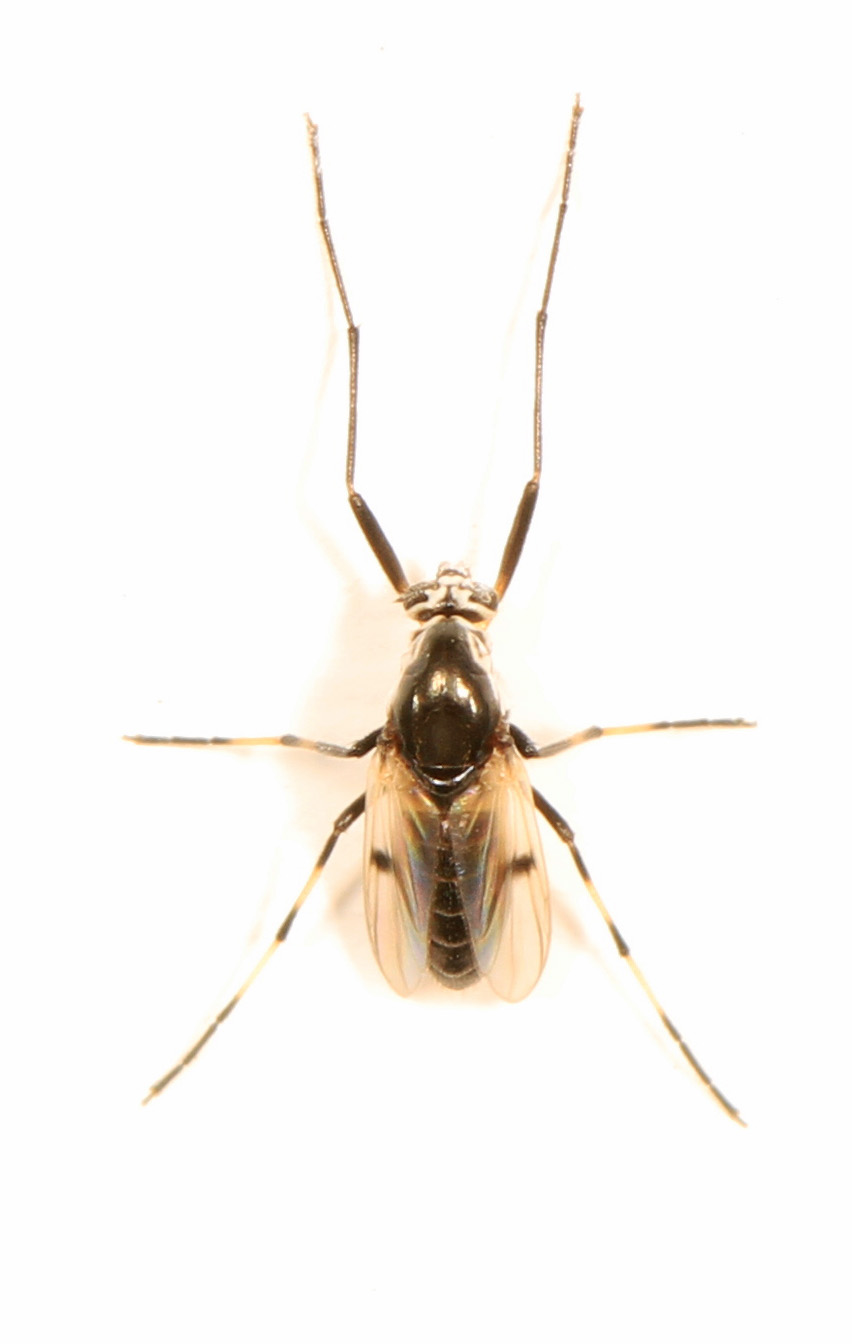

Scientific classification
- Kingdom: Animalia
- Phylum: Arthropoda
- Class: Insecta
- Order: Diptera
- Family: Chironomidae
- Subfamily: Tanypodinae
- Genus: Coelotanypus
- Species: C. scapularis

Binomial name
- Coelotanypus scapularis (Loew, 1866)

Synonyms
- Tanypus scapularis Loew, 1866

= Coelotanypus scapularis =

Species of fly

Coelotanypus scapularis is a species of midge in the family Chironomidae. Larvae are aquatic, feeding on diatoms, crustaceans, oligochaetes, and other insects.

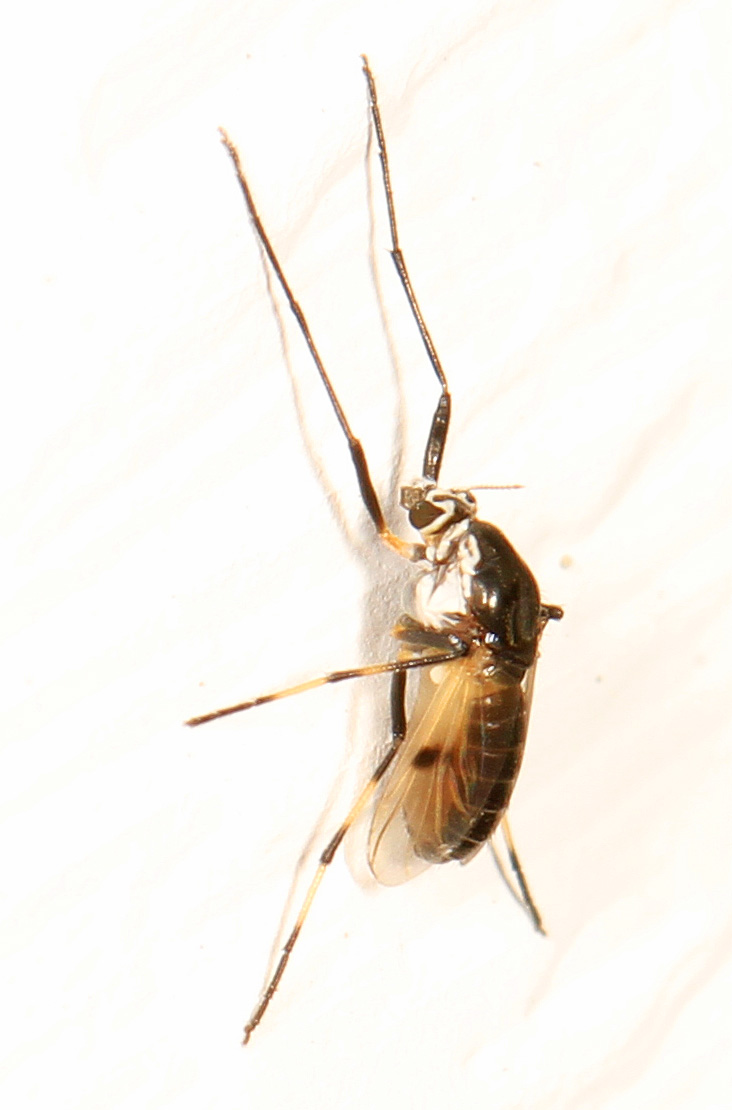
