= Zavrelimyia =

Scientific classification
- Kingdom: Animalia
- Phylum: Arthropoda
- Class: Insecta
- Order: Diptera
- Family: Chironomidae
- Tribe: Pentaneurini
- Genus: Zavrelimyia; Fittkau, 1962

Genus of flies

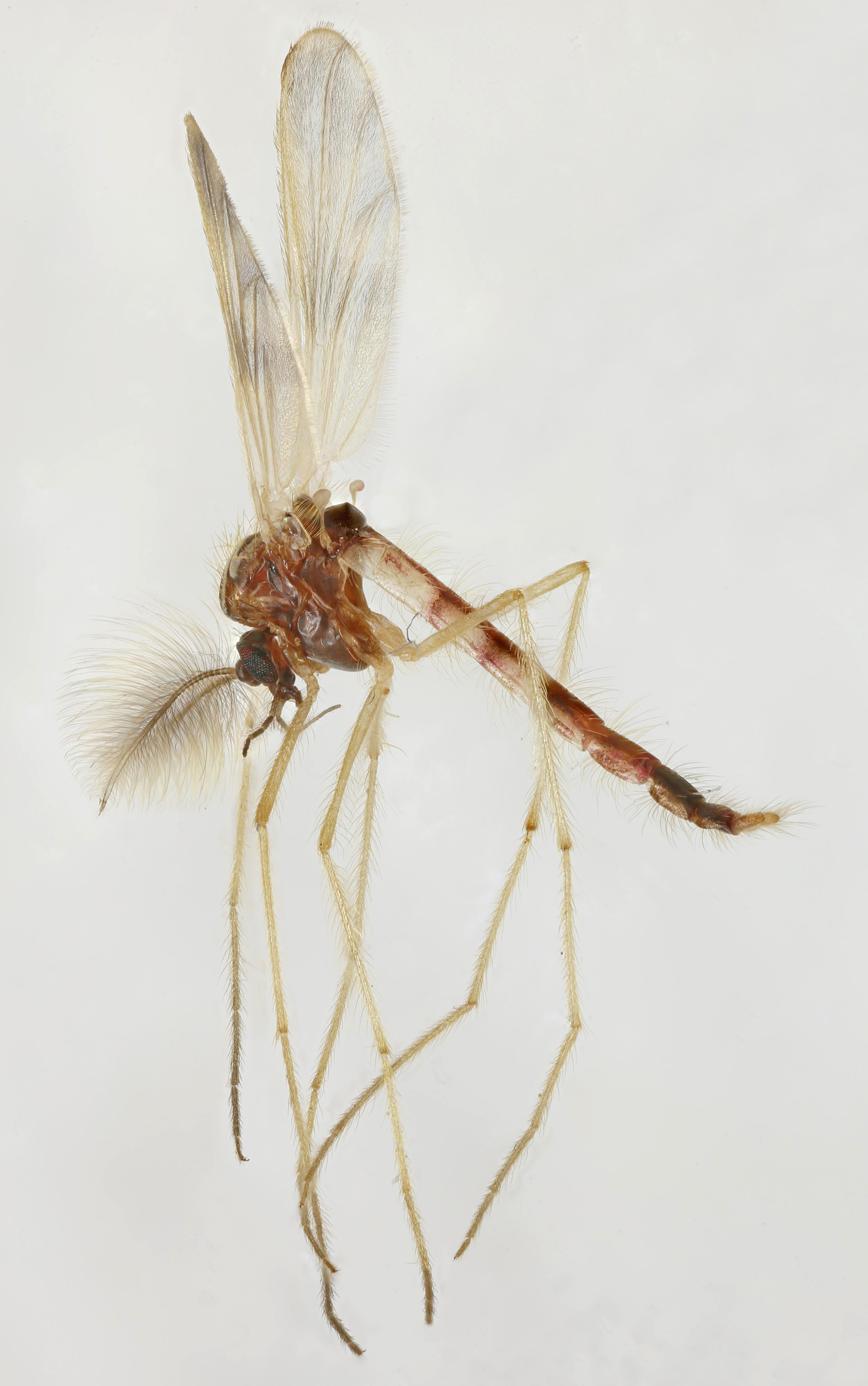
Zavrelimyia barbatipes, Trawscoed, North Wales, 2016.

Zavrelimyia is a genus of non-biting midges in the subfamily Tanypodinae of the family Chironomidae.
