= Conchapelopia garim =

Scientific classification
- Kingdom: Animalia
- Phylum: Arthropoda
- Class: Insecta
- Order: Diptera
- Family: Chironomidae
- Genus: Conchapelopia
- Species: C. garim

Binomial name
- Conchapelopia garim Na & Bae, 2010

Species of fly

Conchapelopia garim is a species of fly belonging to the family Chironomidae (the non-biting midges). This is a medium-sized midge, largely yellow with brown markings towards the end of the abdomen. The specific name refers to the village of Garim, Gapyeong County, South Korea, where the species was discovered near the Gapyeongcheon river.
