= Rheopelopia =

Scientific classification
- Domain: Eukaryota
- Kingdom: Animalia
- Phylum: Arthropoda
- Class: Insecta
- Order: Diptera
- Family: Chironomidae
- Tribe: Pentaneurini
- Genus: Rheopelopia; Fittkau, 1962

Genus of flies

Rheopelopia is a genus of non-biting midges in the subfamily Tanypodinae of the bloodworm family Chironomidae.

== Species ==
- R. acra
- R. eximia (Edwards, 1929)
- R. maculipennis (Zetterstedt, 838])
- R. ornata (Meigen, 1838)
