= Coelotanypus atus =

Scientific classification
- Kingdom: Animalia
- Phylum: Arthropoda
- Class: Insecta
- Order: Diptera
- Family: Chironomidae
- Genus: Coelotanypus
- Species: C. atus

Binomial name
- Coelotanypus atus Roback, 1971

Species of fly

Coelotanypus atus is a species of midge in the family Chironomidae.
