= Tanypus neopunctipennis =

Scientific classification
- Kingdom: Animalia
- Phylum: Arthropoda
- Class: Insecta
- Order: Diptera
- Family: Chironomidae
- Genus: Tanypus
- Species: T. neopunctipennis

Binomial name
- Tanypus neopunctipennis Sublette, 1964

Species of fly

Tanypus neopunctipennis is a species of midge in the family Chironomidae.
