= Nilotanypus =

Scientific classification
- Domain: Eukaryota
- Kingdom: Animalia
- Phylum: Arthropoda
- Class: Insecta
- Order: Diptera
- Family: Chironomidae
- Tribe: Pentaneurini
- Genus: Nilotanypus; Kieffer, 1923

Genus of flies

Nilotanypus is a genus of non-biting midges in the subfamily Tanypodinae of the bloodworm family Chironomidae.
