= Conchapelopia seoulpia =

Scientific classification
- Kingdom: Animalia
- Phylum: Arthropoda
- Class: Insecta
- Order: Diptera
- Family: Chironomidae
- Genus: Conchapelopia
- Species: C. seoulpia

Binomial name
- Conchapelopia seoulpia Na & Bae, 2010

Species of fly

Conchapelopia seoulpia is a species of fly belonging to the family Chironomidae (the non-biting midges). This is a medium-sized midge with pure yellow head and thorax and yellow with brown spots along the abdomen. The specific name refers to the South Korean capital Seoul, where the species was discovered by the Jungnangcheon river. The species has also been recorded near Namyangju.
