= Clinotanypus =

Scientific classification
- Domain: Eukaryota
- Kingdom: Animalia
- Phylum: Arthropoda
- Class: Insecta
- Order: Diptera
- Family: Chironomidae
- Tribe: Clinotanypodini
- Genus: Clinotanypus; Kieffer, 1923

Genus of flies

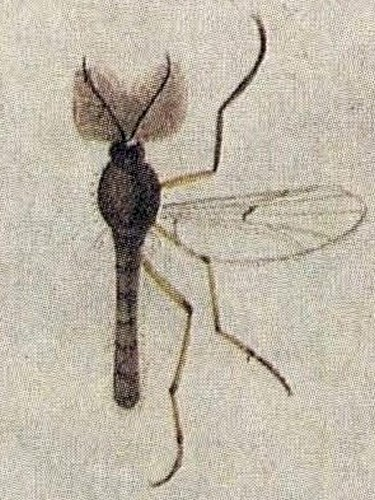

Clinotanypus is a genus of non-biting midges in the subfamily Tanypodinae of the bloodworm family Chironomidae. This genus has a worldwide distribution and inhabit sediments of ponds, lakes and rivers. It is rare to find these midges in Central America.

== Species ==
- Clinotanypus brasiliensis
- Clinotanypus sallesi
