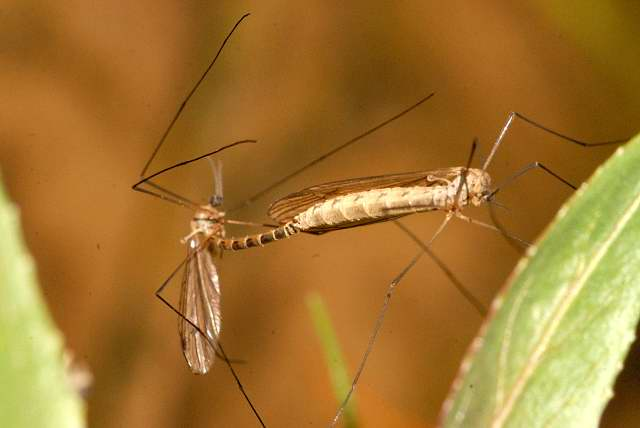
- Trissopelopia longimana

Scientific classification
- Kingdom: Animalia
- Phylum: Arthropoda
- Class: Insecta
- Order: Diptera
- Family: Chironomidae
- Tribe: Pentaneurini
- Genus: Trissopelopia; Kieffer, 1923

Species
- See text

= Trissopelopia =

Genus of flies

Trissopelopia is a genus of non-biting midges in the subfamily Tanypodinae of the bloodworm family Chironomidae.

== Species ==
- T. bifurcata
- T. conformis (Holgrem, 1869)
- T. dimorpha Cheng & Wang, 2005
- T. flavida Kieffer, 1923
- T. fusistylus (Goetghebuer, 1933)
- T. lanceolata Cheng & Wang, 2005
- T. longimana (Sæther, 1839)
- T. ogemawi Roback, 1971
- T. tornetraskensis Edwards, 1941
