= Hudsonimyia =

Scientific classification
- Domain: Eukaryota
- Kingdom: Animalia
- Phylum: Arthropoda
- Class: Insecta
- Order: Diptera
- Family: Chironomidae
- Tribe: Pentaneurini
- Genus: Hudsonimyia; Roback, 1979

Genus of flies

Hudsonimyia is a genus of non-biting midges in the subfamily Tanypodinae of the bloodworm family Chironomidae.

== Species ==
- H. karelena Roback, 1979
- H. parrishi Caldwell & Soponis, 1982
