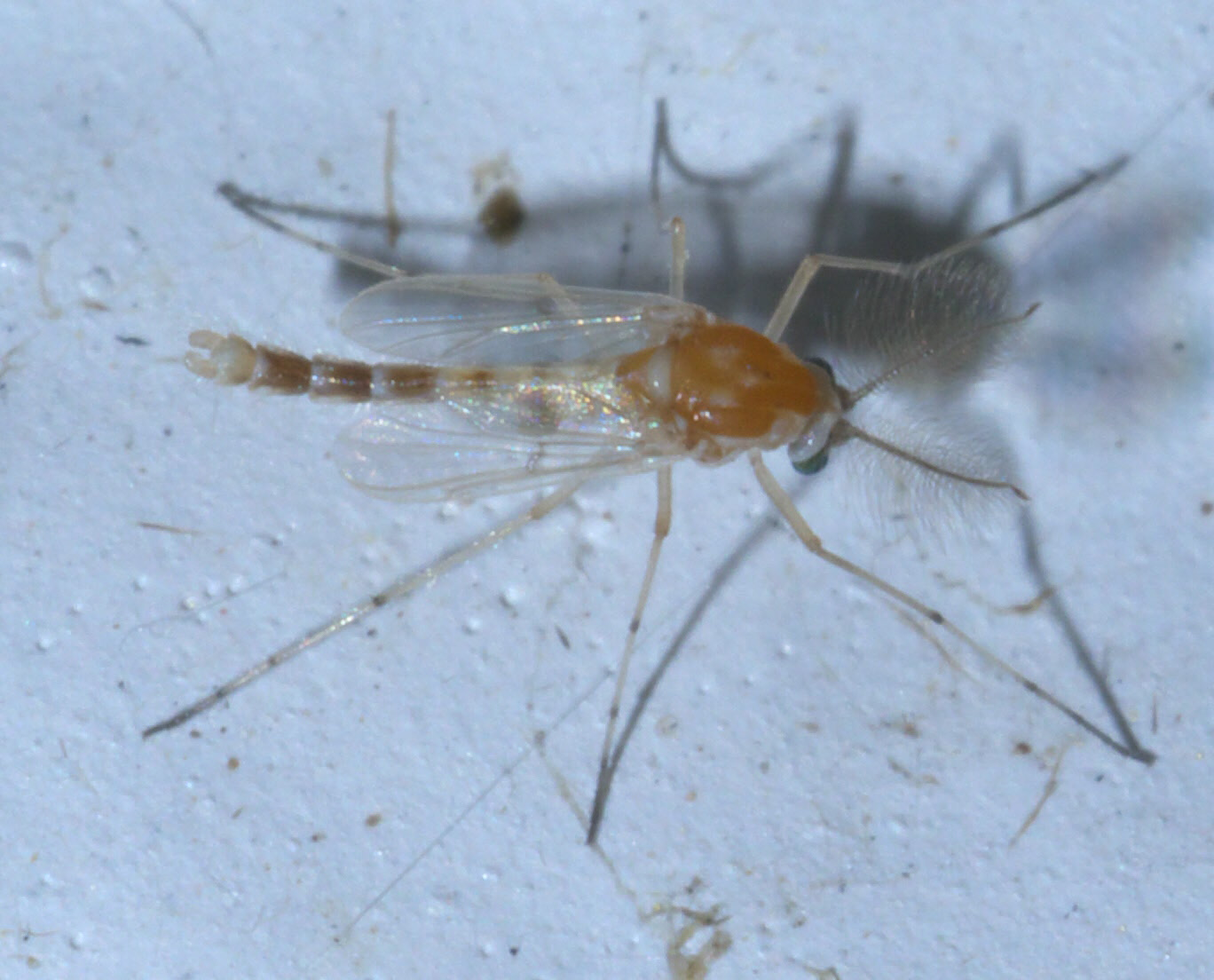
- Procladius bellus

Scientific classification
- Kingdom: Animalia
- Phylum: Arthropoda
- Class: Insecta
- Order: Diptera
- Family: Chironomidae
- Tribe: Procladiini
- Genus: Procladius; Skuse, 1889

Subgenus
- Procladius Skuse, 1889; Holotanypus Roback 1982

Synonyms
- Holotanypus Roback 1982; Psilotanypus Kieffer, 1906

= Procladius =

Genus of flies

Procladius is a genus of non-biting midges in the subfamily Tanypodinae of the bloodworm family Chironomidae.

== Species ==
- P. abetus Roback, 1971
- P. abrupta (Garrett, 1925)
- P. appropinquatus (Lundström, 1916)
- P. arcuata (Garrett, 1925)
- P. barbatulus Sublette, 1964
- P. bellus (Loew, 1866)
- P. bifida (Garrett, 1925)
- P. choreus (Meigen, 1804)
- P. clavus Roback, 1971
- P. crassinervis (Zetterstedt, 1838)
- P. culiciformis (Linnaeus, 1767)
- P. curtus Roback, 1971
- P. denticulatus Sublette, 1964
- Procladius deltaensis
- P. dentus Roback, 1971
- P. desis Roback, 1971
- P. ferrugineus (Kieffer, 1918)
- P. fimbriatus Wülker, 1959
- P. flavifrons Edwards, 1929
- P. freemani Sublette, 1964
- P. fuscus Brundin, 1956
- P. gretis Roback, 1971
- P. imicola Kieffer, 1922
- P. islandicus (Goetghebuer, 1931)
- P. jeris Roback, 1971
- P. johnsoni Roback, 1980
- P. lugens Kieffer, 1915
- P. lugubris (Zetterstedt, 1850)
- P. lundstromi Goetghebuer, 1936
- P. macrotrichus Roback, 1971
- P. nietus Roback, 1971
- P. nudipennis Brundin, 1947
- P. paludicola Skuse, 1889
- P. paragretis Roback, 1971
- P. pectinatus Kieffer, 1909
- P. prolongatus Roback, 1971
- P. riparius (Malloch, 1915)
- P. rivulorum (Kieffer, 1913)
- P. rufovittatus (van der Wulp, 1874)
- P. ruris Roback, 1971
- P. sagittalis (Kieffer, 1909)
- P. serratus (Kieffer, 1909)
- P. signatus (Zetterstedt, 1850)
- P. simplicistilus Freeman, 1948
- P. sublettei Roback, 1971
- P. suecicus Brundin, 1949
- P. trifolia (Garrett, 1925)
- P. vestitipennis (Kieffer, 1917)
- P. vesus Roback, 1971
- P. wilhmi Roback, 1966
