= Tanypus punctipennis =

Scientific classification
- Kingdom: Animalia
- Phylum: Arthropoda
- Class: Insecta
- Order: Diptera
- Family: Chironomidae
- Genus: Tanypus
- Species: T. punctipennis

Binomial name
- Tanypus punctipennis Meigen, 1818

Synonyms
- Tanypus carinatus Sublette, 1964

Species of fly

Tanypus punctipennis is a species of midge in the family Chironomidae. It is found in Europe.
