= Anatopynia =

Scientific classification
- Domain: Eukaryota
- Kingdom: Animalia
- Phylum: Arthropoda
- Class: Insecta
- Order: Diptera
- Family: Chironomidae
- Subfamily: Tanypodinae
- Genus: Anatopynia

Genus of flies

Anatopynia is a genus of non-biting midges of the bloodworm family Chironomidae.

== Distribution and Ecology ==
At present A. plumipes (Fries, 1823) is the only species of Anatopynia (Johanssen, 1905) known from the Palaearctic. The larvae live in the littoral zone of ponds and small lakes. They can be found in polluted standing waters on anaerobic sediments and may be absent from nearby waters with a better water quality. A. plumipes is a predator that feeds on other benthic invertebrates including Ostracods and Chironomus larvae that may be ingested in one piece.
