= Coffmania =

Scientific classification
- Kingdom: Animalia
- Phylum: Arthropoda
- Clade: Pancrustacea
- Class: Insecta
- Order: Diptera
- Family: Chironomidae
- Tribe: Pentaneurini
- Genus: Coffmania; Hazra & Chaudhuri, 2000

Species
- see text

Genus of flies

Coffmania is a genus of small yellow chironomid midges with two known species, both found in the Darjeeling and Sikkim areas of the Indian Himalayas. The generic name honours Professor W. P. Coffman of the University of Pittsburgh.

The larvae and pupae live in cool, shallow, slow-flowing water with a preference for algal mats. The larvae feed largely on other chironomid larvae and also on algae and detritus.

== Species ==
- Coffmania adiecta
- Coffmania animispina
