= Gapyeongcheon =

Watercourse in South Korea

Gapyeongcheon (Korean: 가평천) is a river of South Korea. It is a river of the Han River system. The Gapyeong Rail Park is located adjacent to the stream. The stream was found to be contaminated by bis(2-ethylhexyl) phthalate (DEHP) with 50 ppb.
