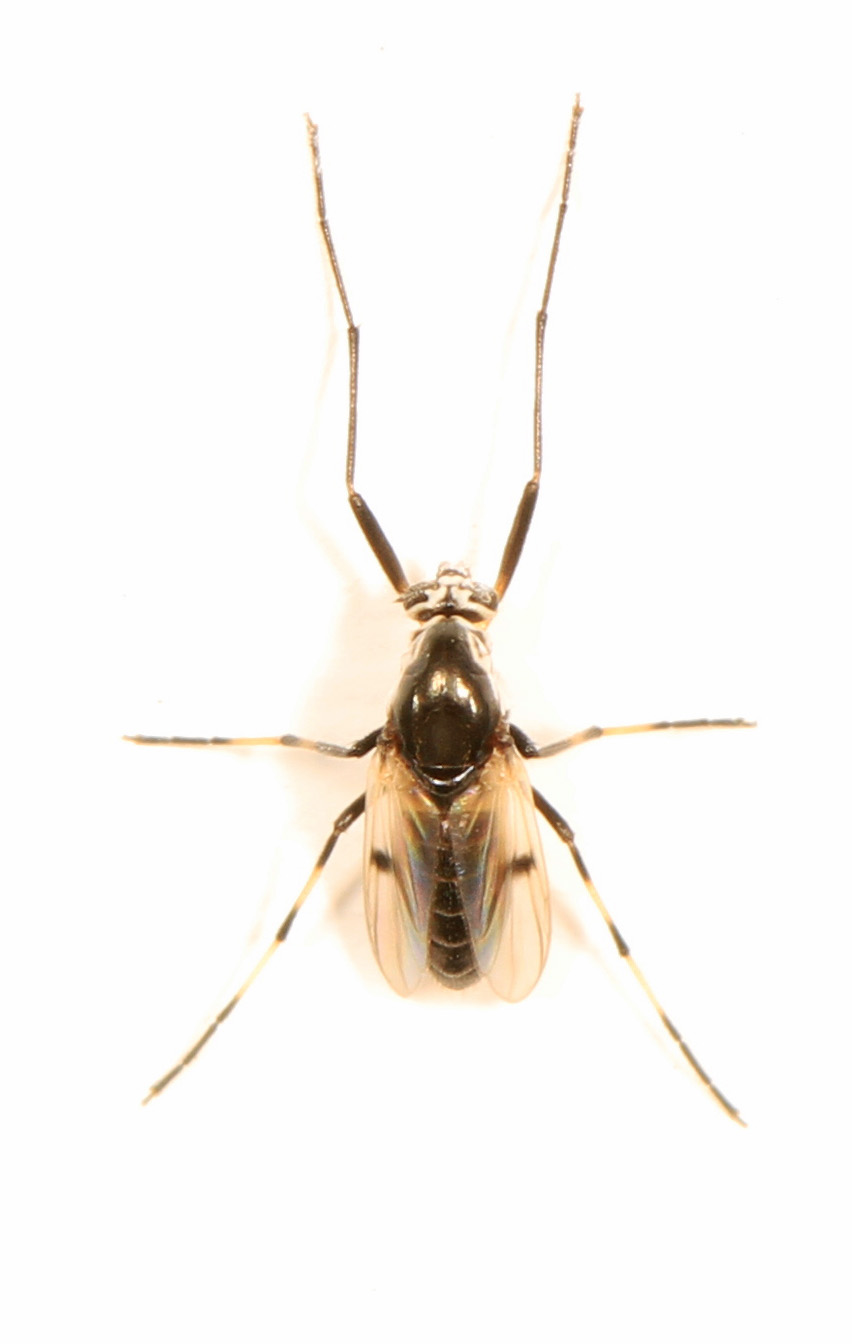
- Coelotanypus scapularis

Scientific classification
- Kingdom: Animalia
- Phylum: Arthropoda
- Class: Insecta
- Order: Diptera
- Family: Chironomidae
- Subfamily: Tanypodinae
- Genus: Coelotanypus; Kieffer, 1913

= Coelotanypus =

Genus of flies

Coelotanypus is a genus of midges in the family Chironomidae. There are about 5 described species in Coelotanypus.

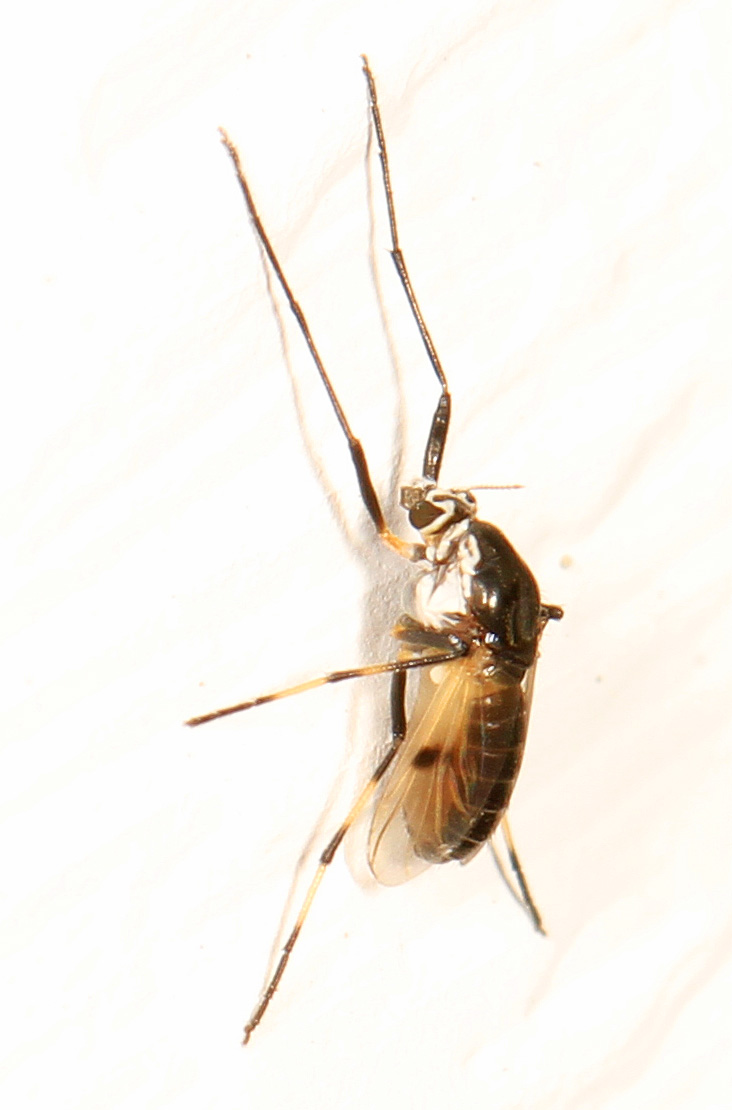
Coelotanypus scapularis

== Species ==
- Coelotanypus atus Roback, 1971
- Coelotanypus concinnus (Coquillett, 1895)
- Coelotanypus naelis Roback, 1963
- Coelotanypus scapularis (Loew, 1866)
- Coelotanypus tricolor (Loew, 1861)
