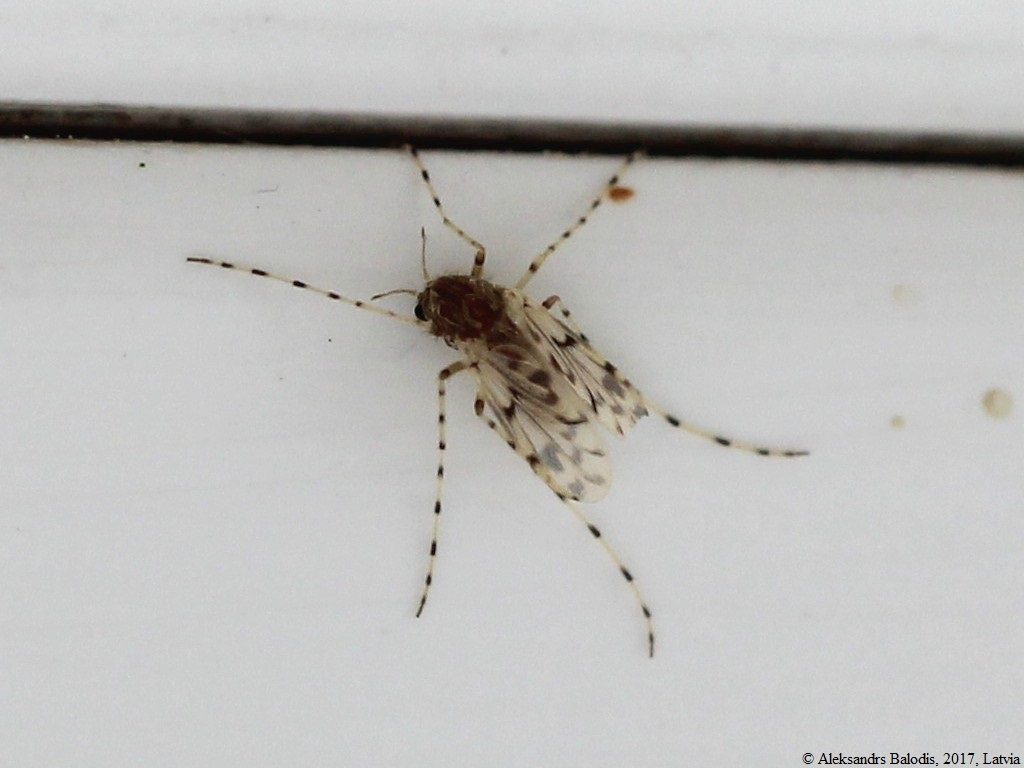

Scientific classification
- Kingdom: Animalia
- Phylum: Arthropoda
- Clade: Pancrustacea
- Class: Insecta
- Order: Diptera
- Family: Chironomidae
- Subfamily: Tanypodinae

Tribes
- 7, see text

= Tanypodinae =

Subfamily of midges

Tanypodinae is a subfamily of midges in the non-biting midge family (Chironomidae). The larvae are generally carnivorous and their mouthparts are adapted for predation on small invertebrates (including other chironomid larvae) although first and second instar larvae also feed on algae.

== Tribes and genera ==
- Tribe Anatopyniini

- Anatopynia Johannsen, 1905

- Tribe Clinotanypodini

- Coelotanypus Kieffer, 1913
- Clinotanypus Kieffer, 1913

- Tribe Macropelopiini

- Apsectrotanypus Fittkau, 1962
- Macropelopia Thienemann, 1916
- Psectrotanypus Kieffer, 1909

- Tribe Natarsiini

- Natarsia Fittkau, 1962

- Tribe Pentaneurini

- Ablabesmyia Johannsen, 1905
- Arctopelopia Fittkau, 1962
- Coffmania Hazra & Chaudhuri, 2000
- Conchapelopia Fittkau, 1957
- Guttipelopia Fittkau, 1962
- Hayesomyia Murray & Fittkau, 1985
- Helopelopia Roback, 1971
- Hudsonimyia Roback, 1979
- Krenopelopia Fittkau, 1962
- Labrundinia Fittkau, 1962
- Larsia Fittkau, 1962
- Monopelopia Fittkau, 1962
- Nilotanypus Kieffer, 1923
- Paramerina Fittkau, 1962
- Pentaneura Philippi, 1865
- Rheopelopia Fittkau, 1962
- Schineriella Murray & Fittkau, 1988
- Telmatopelopia Fittkau, 1962
- Thienemannimyia Fittkau, 1957
- Trissopelopia Kieffer, 1923
- Xenopelopia Fittkau, 1962
- Zavrelimyia Fittkau, 1962

- Tribe Procladiini

- Procladius Skuse, 1889

- Tribe Tanypodini

- Tanypus Meigen, 1803
