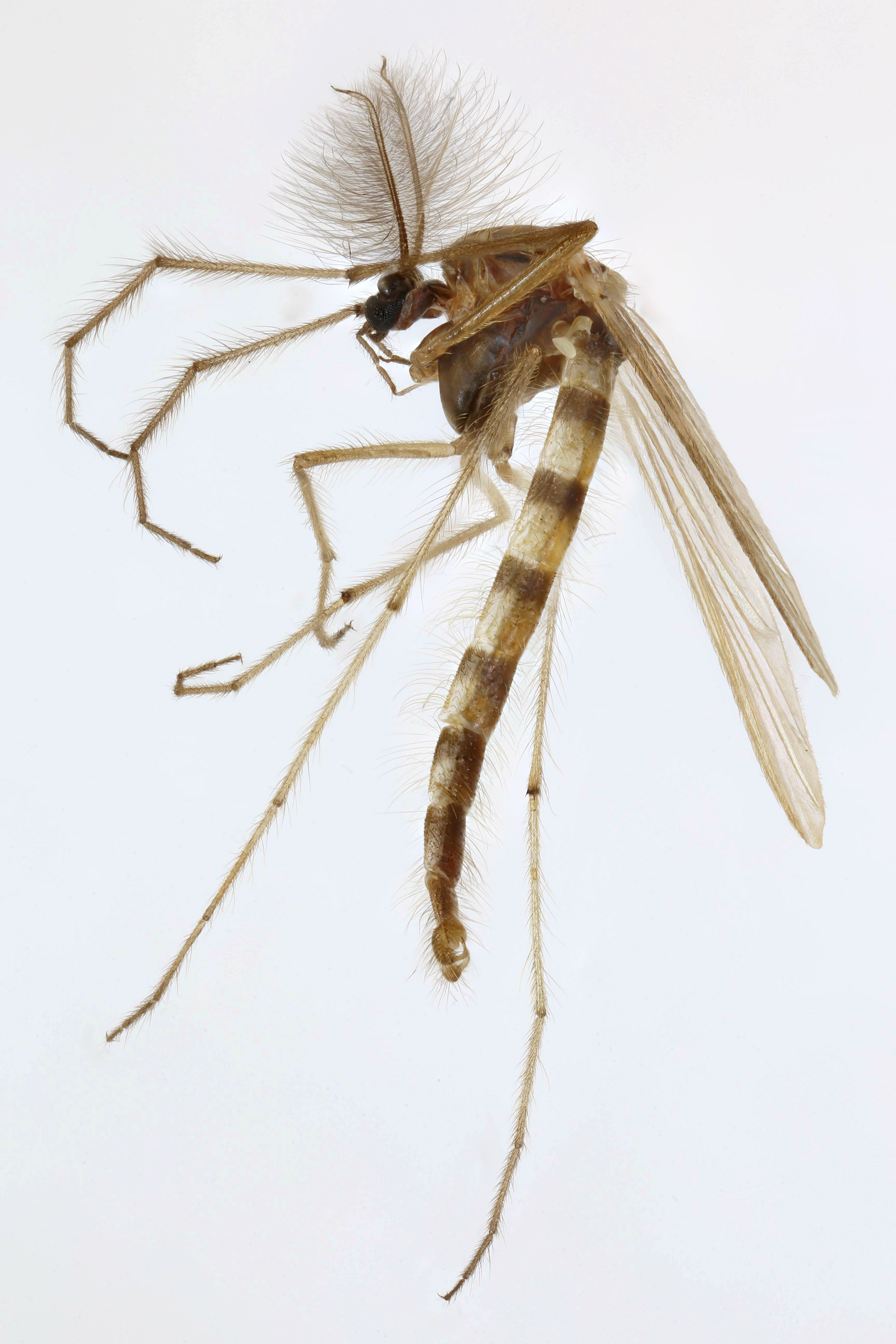
- Arctopelopia melanosoma

Scientific classification
- Kingdom: Animalia
- Phylum: Arthropoda
- Class: Insecta
- Order: Diptera
- Family: Chironomidae
- Genus: Arctopelopia

= Arctopelopia =

Genus of flies

Arctopelopia is a genus of non-biting midges of the bloodworm family Chironomidae. The adipose tissue of the larvae of species in this genus are the host of Coccospora micrococcus, a microsporidium.
