= Procladiini =

Scientific classification
- Kingdom: Animalia
- Phylum: Arthropoda
- Clade: Pancrustacea
- Class: Insecta
- Order: Diptera
- Family: Chironomidae
- Subfamily: Tanypodinae
- Tribe: Procladiini

Genera
- See text

Tribe of flies

Procladiini is a tribe of midges in the non-biting midge family (Chironomidae).

== Genera & species ==
- Genus Procladius Skuse, 1889

- Subgenus Holotanypus Roback, 1982

- P. choreus (Meigen, 1804)
- P. crassinervis (Zetterstedt, 1838)
- P. culiciformis (Linnaeus, 1767)
- P. sagittalis (Kieffer, 1909)
- P. signatus (Zetterstedt, 1850)
- P. simplicistylis Freeman, 1948

- Subgenus Psilotanypus Fittkau, 1906

- P. flavifrons Edwards, 1929
- P. lugens Kieffer, 1915
- P. rufovittatus (van der Wulp, 1874)
