= Conchapelopia =

Scientific classification
- Kingdom: Animalia
- Phylum: Arthropoda
- Class: Insecta
- Order: Diptera
- Family: Chironomidae
- Tribe: Pentaneurini
- Genus: Conchapelopia; Fittkau, 1957

Species
- See text.

Genus of insects

Conchapelopia is a genus of flies belonging to the family Chironomidae (the non-biting midges).

== Species ==
Species include:

=== Eurasian species ===
- C. aagardi Murray, 1987 - Britain, Germany, Norway
- C. abiskoensis Goetghebuer, 1940 - Finland, Sweden
- C. flavifrons (Johannsen, 1905)
- C. garim Na & Bae, 2010 - Korea
- C. hittmairorum Michiels & Spies, 2002 - Europe, North Africa
- C. intermedia Fittkau, 1962 - Scandinavia, Germany
- C. melanops (Meigen, 1818) - Palaearctic, North Africa, Near East
- C. pallidula Meigen, 1818 - Europe, Near East
- C. seoulpia Na & Bae, 2010 - Korea
- C. triannulata (Goetghebuer, 1921) - Europe, Near East
- C. viator (Kieffer, 1911) - Palaearctic, North Africa

=== Nearctic species ===
- C. aleta Roback, 1971
- C. bruna Roback, 1971
- C. currani Walley, 1925
- C. fasciata Beck and Beck, 1966
- C. mera Roback, 1971
- C. pallens (Coquillett, 1902)
- C. paramelanops Roback, 1971
- C. rurika Roback, 1957
- C. telema Roback, 1971
- C. varna Roback, 1981

=== African species ===
- C. cygnus (Kieffer, 1923)
- C. trifascia (Freeman, 1954)
