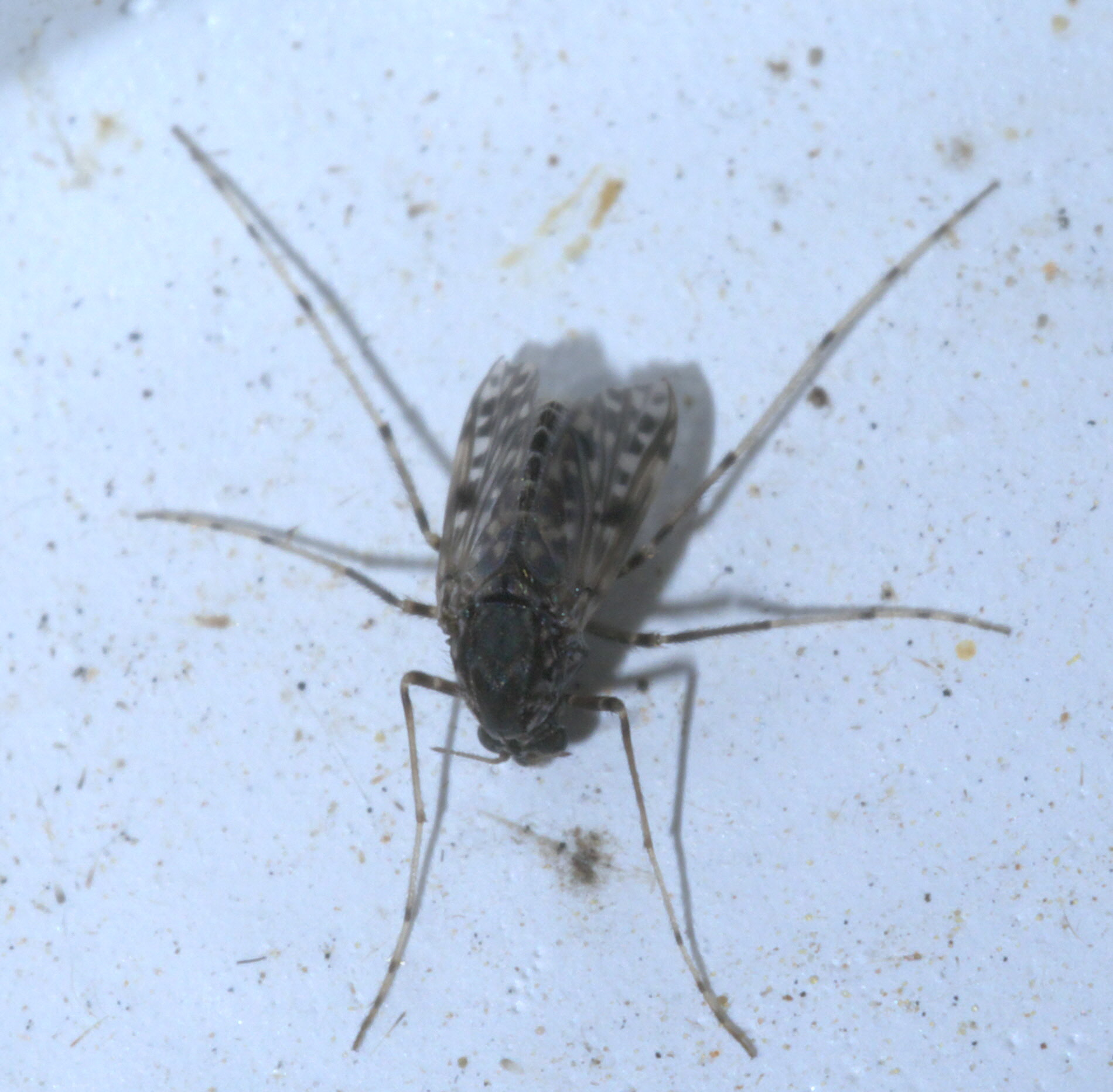

Scientific classification
- Kingdom: Animalia
- Phylum: Arthropoda
- Clade: Pancrustacea
- Class: Insecta
- Order: Diptera
- Family: Chironomidae
- Subfamily: Tanypodinae
- Tribe: Tanypodini
- Genus: Tanypus; Meigen, 1803

Diversity
- at least 100 species

Synonyms
- Pelopia Meigen, 1800

= Tanypus =

Genus of flies

Tanypus is a genus of non-biting midges in the family Chironomidae. There are at least 100 described species in Tanypus.

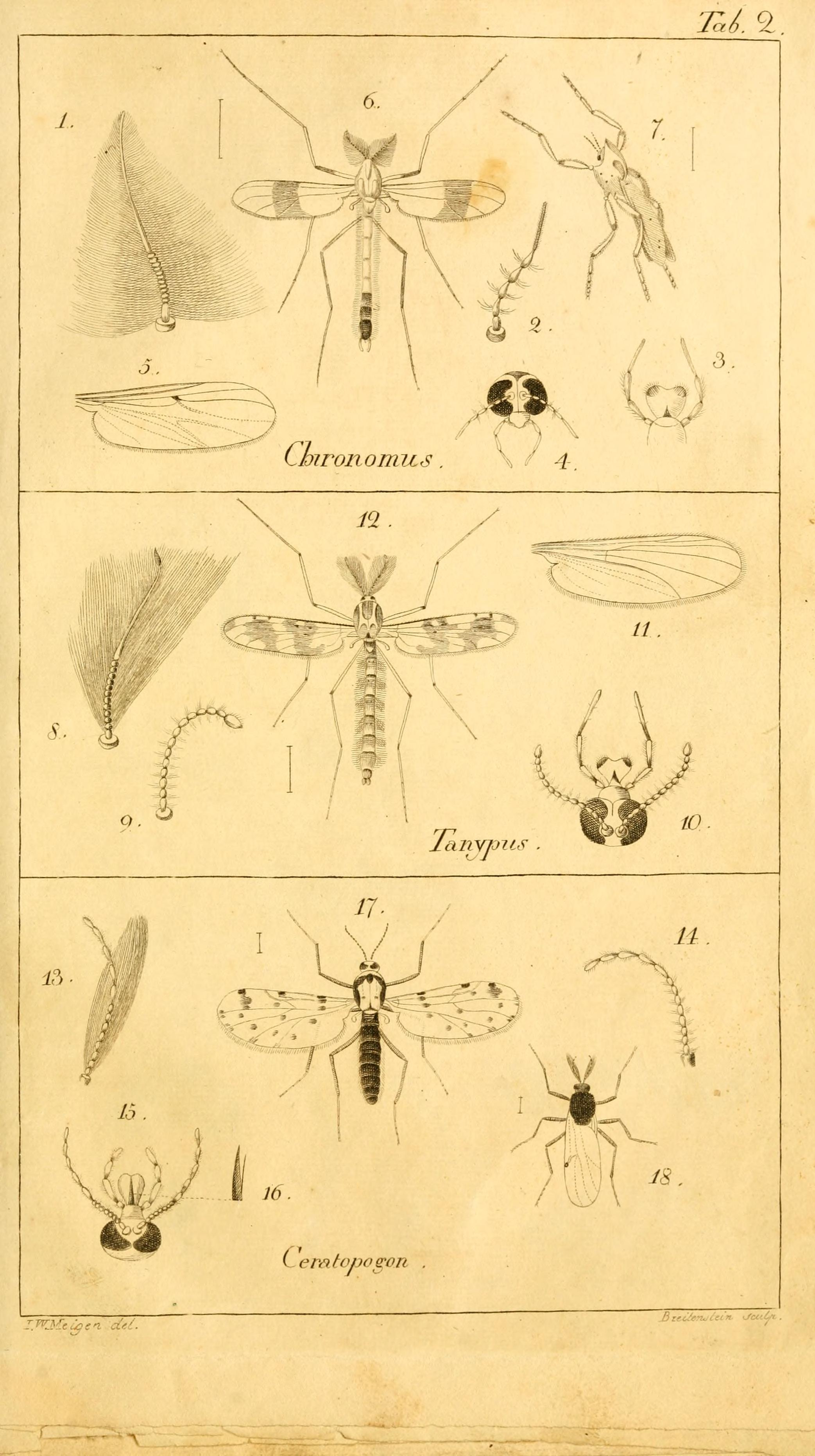
Tanypus in Meigen, Systematische Beschreibung der bekannten europäischen zweiflügeligen Insekten

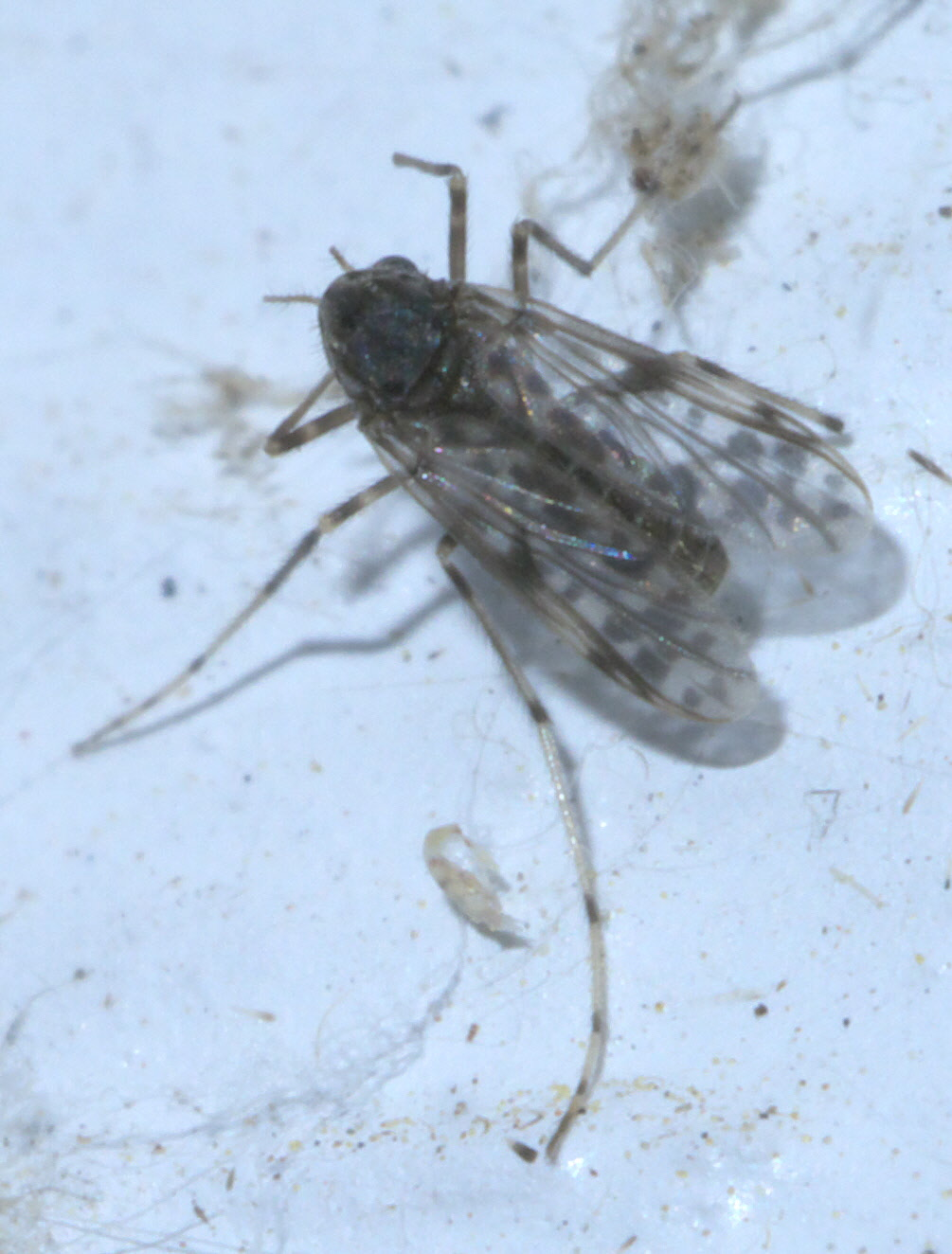

== See also ==
- List of Tanypus species
