= Ernst Josef Fittkau =

German entomologist and herpetologist (1927–2012)

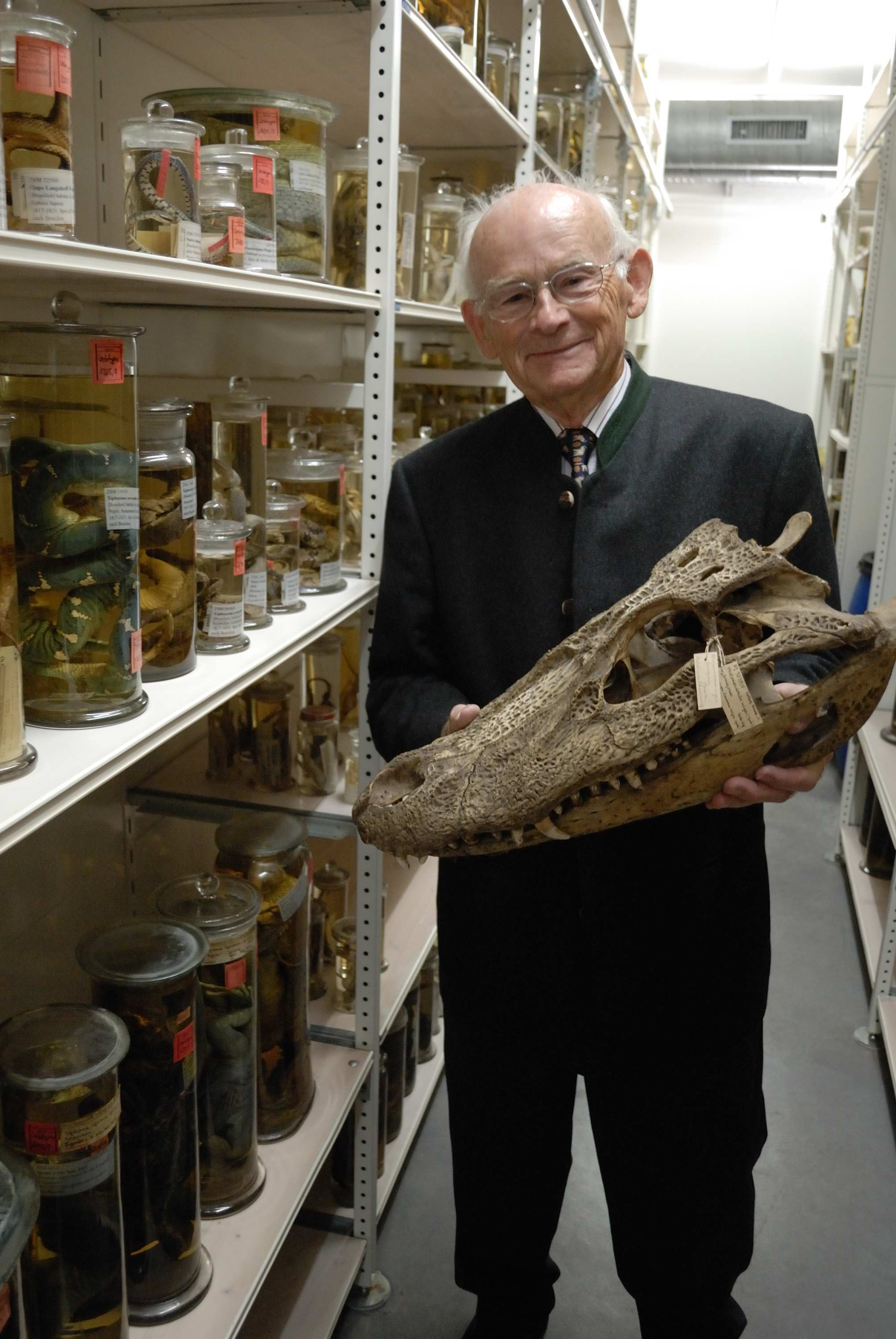
Ernst Josef Fittkau, September 2010

Ernst Josef Fittkau (22 July 1927 – 12 May 2012) was a German entomologist and herpetologist.

== Career ==
In entomology he specialized in the Diptera, especially the family Chironomidae. In herpetology he specialized in crocodiles. He collected natural history specimens on every continent except Antarctica, beginning with South America in 1960. He was Director of the Bavarian State Collection of Zoology in Munich (Zoologische Staatssammlung München) from 1976 to 1992.

== Legacy ==
Fittkau is commemorated in the scientific name of a species of South American lizard, Liolaemus fittkaui.

== Publications ==
- Fittkau EJ (1995). Johann Baptist Ritter von Spix. Rundgespräche der Kommission für Ökologie. Tropenforschung. Bayerische Akademie der Wissenschaften 10: 29–38. (in German).

== Sources ==
- Hausmann, Axel; Spies, Martin; Diller, Juliane (2012). "In memoriam Prof. Dr. Ernst Josef Fittkau (22. Juli 1927 - 12. Mai 2012)". Spixiana 35 (2): 161-176. (pdf). (in German).
