= Dinosaur Ridge (disambiguation) =

Dinosaur Ridge is a ridge in Colorado, United States.

Dinosaur Ridge may also refer to:

- Dinosaur Ridge (Gangwon), a ridge in Gangwon-do, South Korea
- Dinosaur Ridge (Alberta), a ridge in Alberta, Canada
