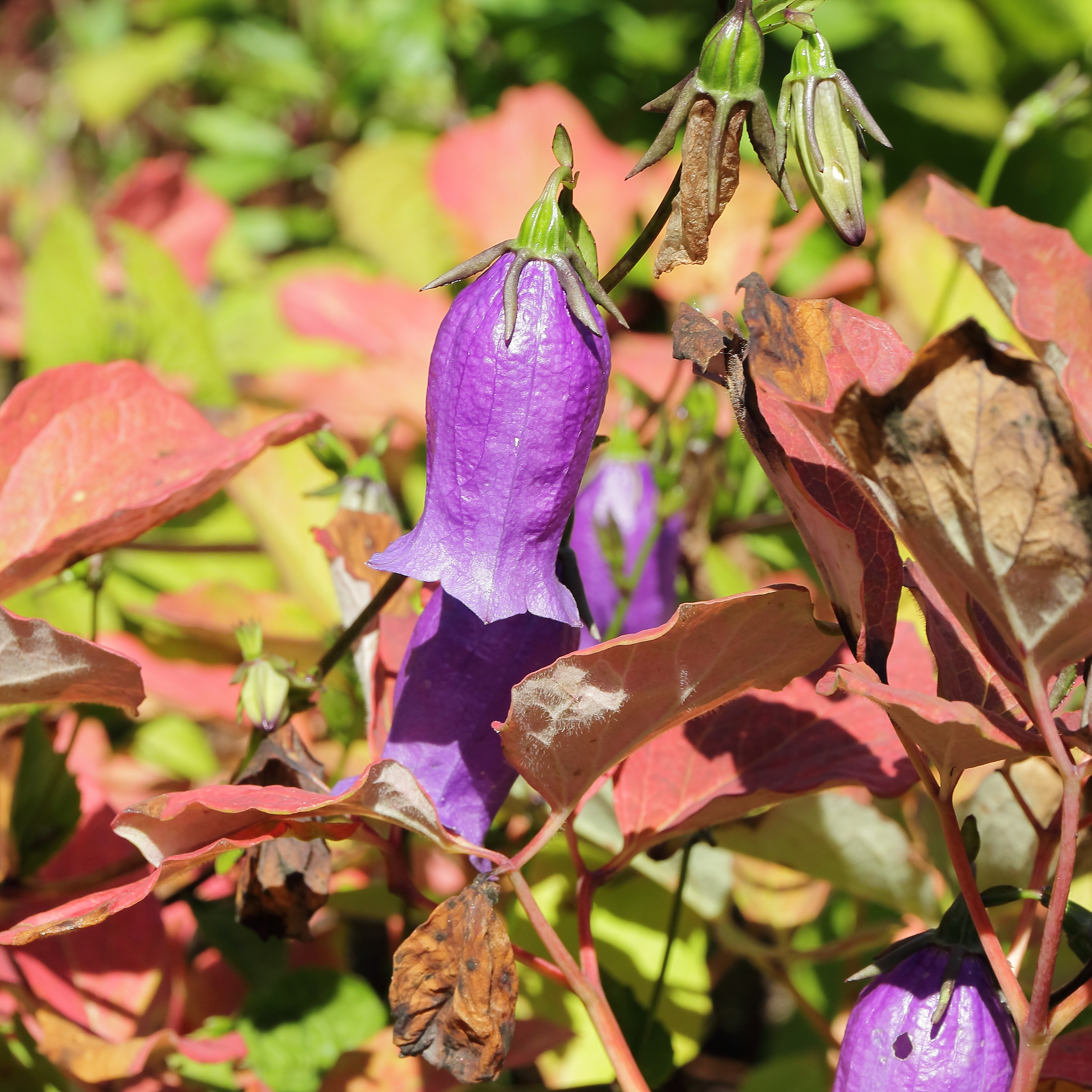

Scientific classification
- Kingdom: Plantae
- Clade: Tracheophytes
- Clade: Angiosperms
- Clade: Eudicots
- Clade: Asterids
- Order: Asterales
- Family: Campanulaceae
- Subfamily: Campanuloideae
- Genus: Hanabusaya; Nakai
- Species: H. asiatica

Binomial name
- Hanabusaya asiatica (Nakai) Nakai

Synonyms
- Symphyandra asiatica

= Hanabusaya =

Genus of flowering plants

Hanabusaya is a monotypic genus of flowering plants in the family Campanulaceae, containing the single species Hanabusaya asiatica. It is endemic to Korea. It is known in English as diamond bluebell and in Korean as Geumgang Chorong (Korean: 금강초롱꽃), having been named for the site at which it was first discovered, Geumgangsan Mountain.

This species is a perennial herb bearing pendulous, bell-shaped flowers with five-lobed violet corollas. The flowers are pollinated by bees. The plant lacks basal leaves, a characteristic that distinguishes it from its close relatives.

The plant is limited to the mountains of the east-central Korean Peninsula. It is known from Mount Bokgyesan, for example. It is often found on north-facing mountain slopes, mainly between 580 and 1,396 meters in altitude, according to sampling studies. It is associated with the plant species Carex siderosticta, Ainsliaea acerifolia, Calamagrostis arundinacea, Athyrium yokoscense, and Astilbe rubra. The slopes are dominated by Quercus mongolica, the Mongolian oak, and Acer pseudosieboldianum, the Korean maple. The substrates are loam and sand.

Genus Hanabusaya had a second species, H. latisepala, but it is now considered to be a variety of H. asiatica.
