= Geumganggul Cave =

Cave in Seokraksan National Park, South Korea

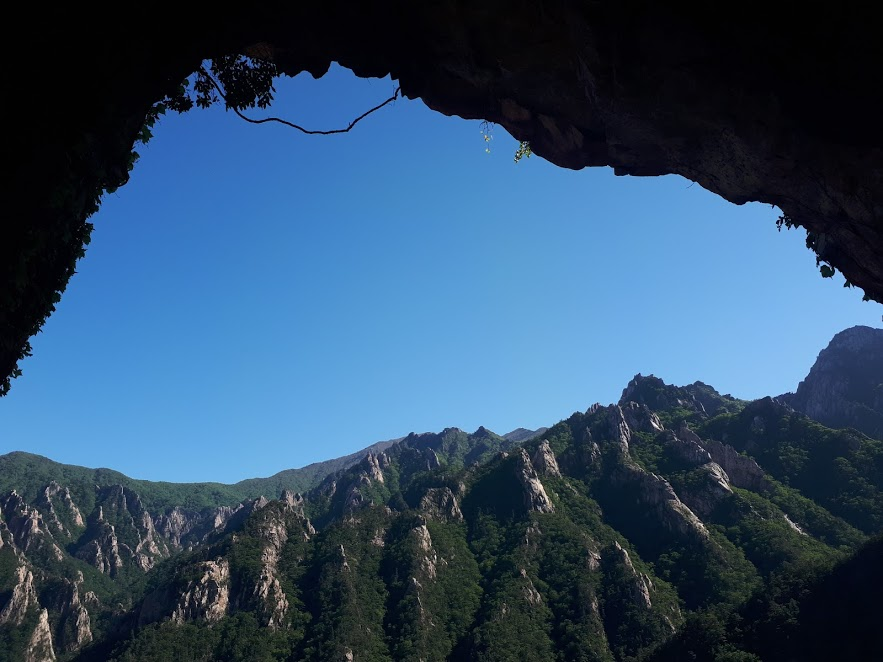
- View from Geumganggul Cave
- Interactive map of Geumganggul Cave
- Location: Seoraksan National Park, Sokcho, South Korea
- Coordinates: 38°09′58″N 128°27′35″E
- Access: Public tour

Geumganggul Cave (Korean: 금강굴) is a cave located in Seoraksan National Park in Sokcho, South Korea. The cave is in the rocks of the mountain and is around 600 meters above sea level. It was once a place of worship and contains a Buddha stone. At the end of the route, hikers need to use stairs and bridges. It takes approximately two hours to travel from the temple Sinheungsa to Geumganggul Cave via Biseondae.
