= Demicryptochironomus wontongensis =

Scientific classification
- Kingdom: Animalia
- Phylum: Arthropoda
- Clade: Pancrustacea
- Class: Insecta
- Order: Diptera
- Family: Chironomidae
- Genus: Demicryptochironomus
- Species: D. wontongensis

Binomial name
- Demicryptochironomus wontongensis Ree, 2012

Species of insect

Demicryptochironomus is a species of non-biting midges in the bloodworm family Chironomidae.

The species was first described in 2012 by Han Il Ree.

The species is endemic to Korea, where it is seen in October in clear streams at the base of Seoraksan, in Gangwon-do.
