= Gongnyong Ridge =

Ridge of Seoraksan Mountain, South Korea

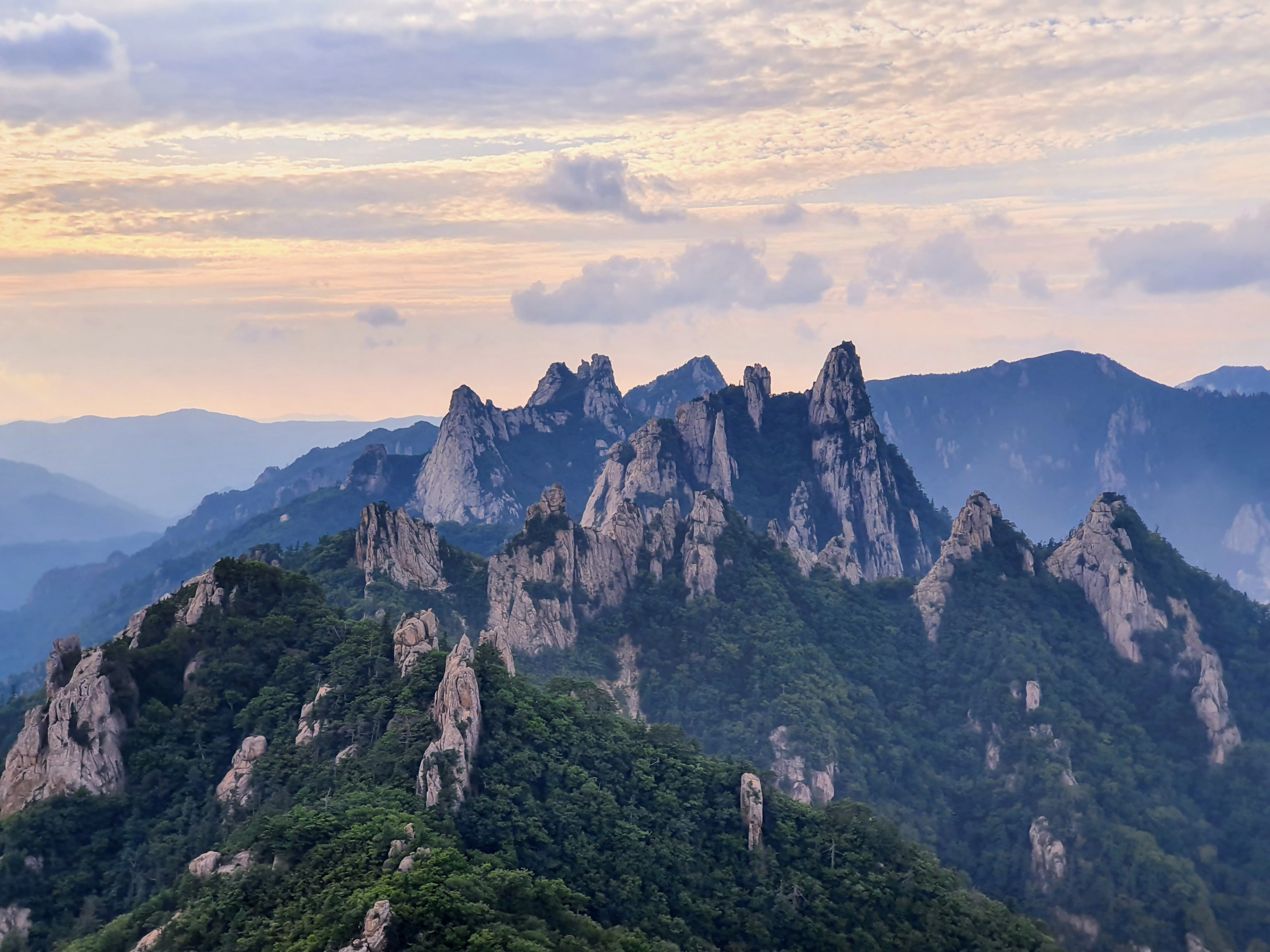
- The Gongnyong Ridge at Seoroksan, taken from Sinseonam Rock

- Location within South Korea
- Location: Gangwon Province, South Korea
- Coordinates: 38°08′39″N 128°27′07″E
- Area: 1,313,080 m^{2} (14,133,900 sq ft)
- Governing body: Korea National Park Service

Gongnyong Ridge (Korean: 설악산 공룡능선, lit. 'Dinosaur Ridge') is a mountain ridge in Seoraksan National Park, located in Gangwon Province, South Korea. It is the central ridge of Seoraksan, dividing it. The ridge earns its name due to the mountain peaks in the ridge looking as "vigorous and dynamic as a dinosaur rising from the ground". The Gongnyong Ridge was formed from the Jurassic period granite of Seoraksan being shaped over the years due to tectonic shifts and erosion.

It has earned much recognition because of its beauty, both from domestic and international sources, such as being labelled the most scenic location among the national parks of South Korea. It is also known for frequent accidents to hikers and sightseers.

== Geography ==
The Gongnyong Ridge extends from Madeungnyeong Pass to Sinseonam Rock. It is the central ridge of Seoraksan, dividing the park from east to west, forming the boundary between Sokcho and Inje County. Because of this, water from the Sea of Japan evaporates and meets the cold air near the spikes of the ridge, creating large amounts of fog and clouds near the peaks. This makes visibility of the ridge difficult, or impossible in many cases. Being the central ridge of the park, it provides views of both inner and outer Seorak.

The ridge earns its name due to the mountain peaks in the ridge looking as "vigorous and dynamic as a dinosaur rising from the ground" by the Cultural Heritage Administration of Korea. Gongnyong is a Romanization of the word 공룡, which means 'dinosaur' in Korean. A hiking trail through the ridge is very strenuous, with steep peaks, and requires 13 hours to complete. The trail through the ridge itself is 5.1 km, going through Seorak-dong, Biseondae, the ridge itself, and exiting through Cheonbuldong Valley and back out through Biseondae.

The ridge is often considered one of the most difficult mountain courses to climb in Korea.

The tallest peak in the ridge is Nahanbong, at 1,298 meters (4,259 ft).

== Geology ==
Seorak Mountain is formed out of granite rock created during the Cretaceous era of the Mesozoic period. Around the same time, there were tectonic shifts in the region that expanded the Sea of Japan, raising the body of bedrock around Seoraksan. The shift stressed the rock, creating cracks and fractures in the granite. The rock around the fractures were penetrated more easily by water, and they were eroded over time, helping form the Gongnyong Ridge. In the Gongnyong Ridge, most of the rock has been eroded or cracked away, with only the solid core remaining to form the spiked rock formations. Those spiked rock formations make the hiking trail through the ridge very steep, without flat areas.

== Protected status ==
The Gongnyong Ridge was designated as Korea's 103rd Scenic site in March 2013, along with other areas at Seoraksan. In 2019, it was listed as one of CNN's 50 beautiful places in South Korea. It is also listed number 1 in the 100 best scenic sites among South Korea's national parks.

== Accidents ==
Accidents from exhaustion are very common, especially in winter. An incident in February 1969 led to 10 hikers being killed from an avalanche at the base of the ridge. This led to the establishment of a shelter at the base of the ridge, named Huieungak after the person that proposed the shelter. Another incident in December 1993 left two university students, out of a party of four, dead from hypothermia because of them losing their way at night. The students got lost at dark near the cliff of Sinseonam Rock, leading to the party taking a circuitous route and arriving at a different shelter at another point in the park. The park cautions against leaving for the ridge near dark, and recommends leaving for the ridge at 10 a.m. in winter, and 12 p.m. in summer.

On July 26, 2010, a 60-year-old man died after falling 5 m (16 ft) from a cliff in Sinseonam Rock. On August 1, 2010, a 52-year-old man died after falling 100 m (330 ft) from a cliff in Sinseonam Rock. Also, on August 4, 2010, a 40-year-old man died after straying off the route to rest and falling 50 m (160 ft) from a cliff near the midpoint of the ridge, at Peak 1275.
