= Ulsanbawi =

Rock in Gangwon Province, South Korea

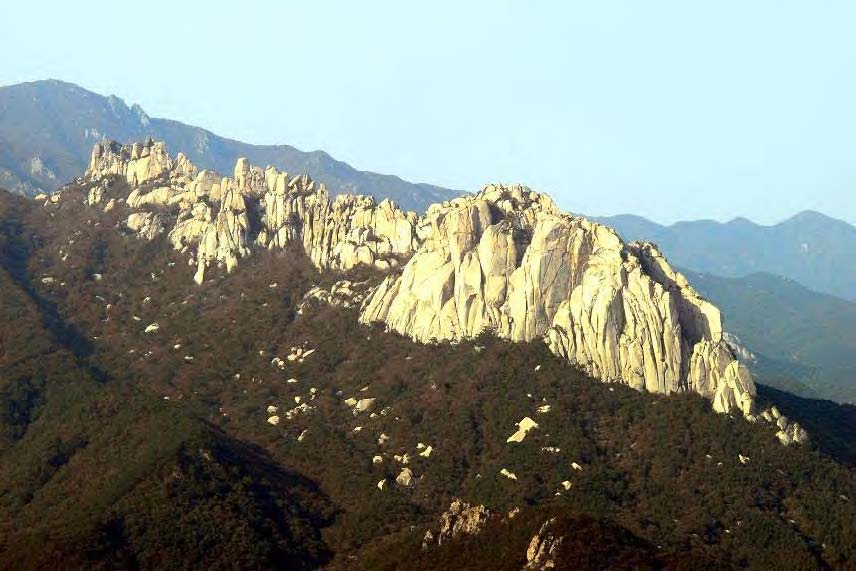
- Ulsanbawi Rock (Korean: 울산바위) seen from the Misiryeong Ridge

Highest point
- Elevation: 874 m (2,867 ft)
- Coordinates: 38°11′36.6″N 128°28′32.6″E

Geography
- Location within South Korea
- Location: Seoraksan, South Korea

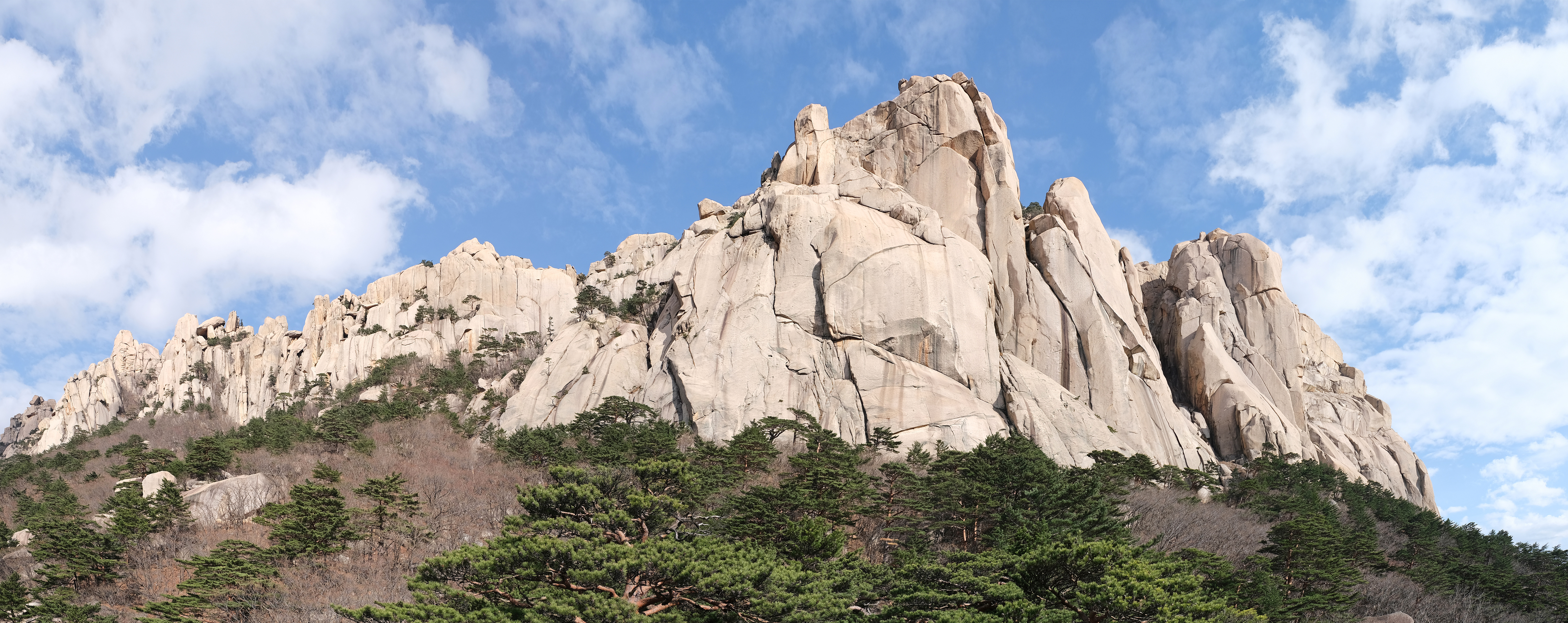
Ulsanbawi Rock

Ulsanbawi (Korean: 울산바위) or Ulsan Rock is a rock with six peaks. It is situated in Seoraksan National Park in Sokcho, Gangwon Province, South Korea. Ulsanbawi is one of the primary attractions of Seoraksan, along with Heundeulbawi, Biryeong waterfall (비룡폭포), and Yukdam waterfall (육담 폭포).

== Geography ==
Ulsanbawi is located at Seorak Mountain. The exact location of Ulsanbawi is 1091 Seoraksan-ro, Sokcho, Gangwon-do.

Ulsan Rock is 873 meters above sea level, and if we estimate it from the entrance of Seoraksan, the height is about 600 m. It is in a folding screen shape. It is made up of cliffs on all sides and It consists of six peaks. The peak that consists of rock shows precipices that are almost vertical. Also, there are five crock-shaped holes. The rock's height is 200 m and the slope is very steep. The circumference of Ulsanbawi is 4 km.

Seoraksan, which Ulsanbawi located on, is the highest mountain comprising Daebo granite interpenetrated in the Mesozoic. Especially, Ulsanbawi is terrain showing signs of differential erosion and weathering along granite facies well. Ulsanbawi is single rocky mountain which has endured weathering because it had less crack than surroundings except for the growing vegetation below. Under Ulsanbawi, it shows some of tafoni and tor by small-scale weathering.

== Sinheungsa ==
Sinheungsa temple.

It is a head temple of the Jogye Order of Korean Buddhism. Sinheungsa is also located on Seoraksan National Park, near Ulsanbawi. In 652 (Jinduk Queen 6), the Jajang founded the temple of Orientation (香 城 寺). At that time, Gyeongjoam and Yeonginam were also built. At this time, the magnetic field is made up of a pagoda, and it is said that the pagoda (佛 舍利) was sealed. However, in the year of 698 (7th year of King Yejosa), the oriental temple was burnt down with a powerful cancer and remained in ruins for three years. In 701, Uisang(義湘) moved to the amphitheater, and the temple was rebuilt and the name of the temple was changed to the Seonjeongsa(禪定寺). At this time, Uisang(義湘) was enshrined in this section by forming the three Buddhist festivals of Amitabha, Gwanseumbosal, and Bodhisattva Bodhisattva. In 1644, while Yeongseo, Pungyo, and Hyeonwon originated in the middle of the middle, a new monk, who appeared in the same Koryoan temple three days a day. Recently, in October 1997, the world's largest bronze statue of 14.6 m in height was laid in front of the order in 10 years after it was created. This Bronze statue of Great Buddha is also called "Unification Great Buddha", which was built with the desire for unification. The annexed hermitage is composed of Namwonam, which was built at the site of the temple, and Gyeongjoam, which was built in 655, and Anangyam, which was built in 1785 (Jeongjo 9).

== Literature ==
=== Poems about Ulsanbawi ===
People who lived in the Joseon Dynasty era wrote poems about Ulsanbawi. This is a list of poets who made poems about Ulsanbawi:

These are Korean names

- Ju Sebung (Hangul: 주세붕; Hanja: 周世鵬; 1495–1554)
- Mun Lyeo (Hangul: 문려; Hanja: 文勵; 1553–1605)
- Hŏ Chŏk (Hangul: 허적; Hanja: 許; 1563–1640)
- Jowihan (Hangul: 조위한; Hanja: 趙緯韓; 1567–1649)
- Lee Min Gu (Hangul: 이민구; Hanja: 李敏求; 1589–1670)
- O Suk (Hangul: 오숙; 1592–1634)
- Lee Gyeong Seok(Hangul: 이경석; Hanja: 李景奭; 1595–1671)
- Lee Dong Pyo (Hangul: 이동표; Hanja: 李東標; 1644–1700)
- Lee Hae Jo (Hangul: 이해조; Hanja: 李海朝; 1660–1711)
- Kim Chang Heub(Hangul: 김창흡; Hanja: 金昌翕; 1653–1722)
- Jo Ha Mang (Hangul: 조하망; Hanja: 曺夏望; 1682–1747)
- Lee Myeong Hwan (Hangul: 이명환; Hanja: 李明煥; 1718–1764)
- Yu Gyeong Si (Hangul:유경시; Hanja: 柳敬時; 1666–1737)

The poem "On Mt. Cheonhu" was written by Yu Gyeong Si (Hangul: 유경시; Hanja: 柳敬時; 1666–1737) who was a government official in the Joseon Dynasty. It is included in Yugeumgangsanlog (Hangul: 유금강산록; Hanja: 遊金剛山錄). The poem describes Ulsanbawi in the following:

It was a folding screen around a brick wall.
Who could make a good cut?
The trace of the past is already gone.
The cave is just keeping its name.

In 1746, Lee Myung Hwan (Hangul: 이명환; Hanja: 李明煥; 1718–1764) wrote a poem while traveling around Mt. Geumgang and Mt. Seorak along the eastern coast of Korea. This poem is included in Haeagjib(Hangul: 해악집; Hanja: 海嶽集) volume 1. The poem describes Ulsanbawi in the following:

It's north of Seorak, here east of Geumgang.
High and high peaks that looks like tied up jasper.
I consider this unfathomable cave to home,
I must've come to cloud over the sea by wind

=== Travel essays about Ulsanbawi ===
People who lived in the Joseon Dynasty era wrote travel essays after viewing Ulsanbawi. In 1832, people later published a garland named EouJib(Hangul: 어우집; Hanja: 於于集) based on the posthumous works of Yu Mong In (Hangul: 유몽인; Hanja: 柳夢寅; 1559–1623). In volume 1, he described Ulsanbawi in the following:

It is called Mount Cheonhu because when a hole of the stone is making a sound, the wind blows. When I came back with a cane, the odd mountain peaks look like bundled up poles. And the flat rocks lay like usual, but the faraway place(천애절벽)settle in a strange way. There is a temple in the cave of Mount Cheonhu and when the wind blows over ten million trees, it seems that the Cheon-gun is advancing with a spear in its hand.

In 1689, Hŏ Mok (1595–1682) published Kiŏn (Hangul:기언; Hanja: 記言). In volume 24 he described Ulsanbawi in the following:

Mount Cheonhu is another mountain at the eastern shore of Mt. Seorak, and it is located on the southern edge of Suseong. It is marvelous and strikingly beautiful, with nine peaks overlooking the wide sea to the east. The mountain was named Cheonhu because it created a strong breeze when it cried. On the south, there is Seokdalma, and on the north, Seonindae is seen.

== Tales ==
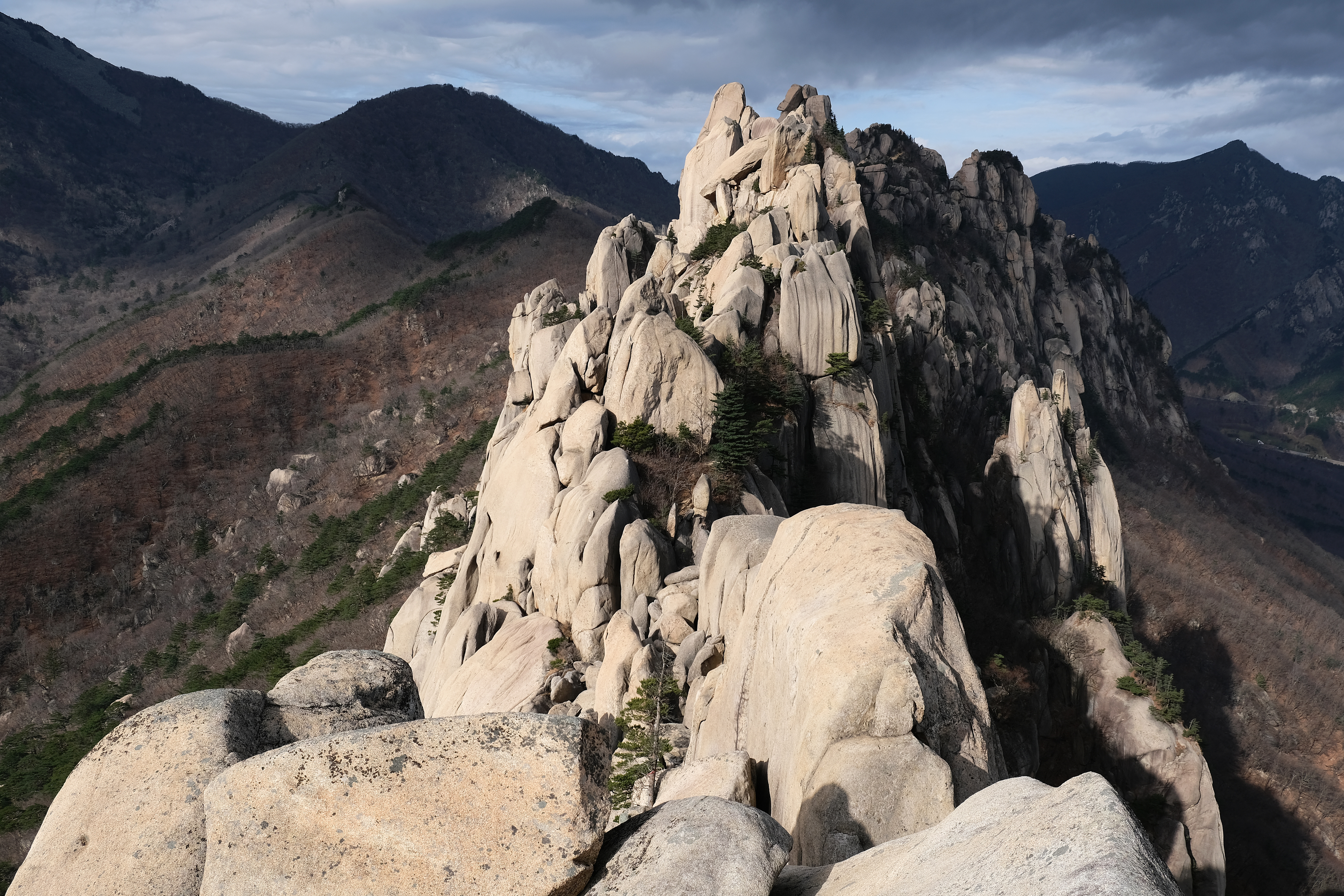
Ulsanbawi in 2022.

Tales about Ulsanbawi were passed down orally by Buddhism in Gangwondo Sokcho, South Korea. The second tale is a device to ensure that the first tale is true.

=== Ulsan Bawi's name's origin ===
One day, the god of mountains was making Mt. Geumgang. For a few days he was pondering: "How to make the most beautiful mountain?" His conclusion was that carving twelve thousands of peaks differently will make the mountain greater.

Because there weren't enough rocks, he ordered other big rocks to go to the mountain. So a rock in the Ulsan also went on a trip. But it couldn't get on time because it was too big and clunky. When Ulsanbawi passed Mt. Seorak's messenger, he said "God doesn't need more rocks. So don't come."

It was frustrated and cried, because it had walked so far and couldn't save its face if it went back to its home. The messenger felt pity for it. So he said "Mt. Seorak isn't better than Mt. Geumgang but isn't Mt. Seorak better than Ulsan?"

So we call the bawi Ulsanbawi because it was from Ulsan. And there is a lake which is made from Ulsan bawi's tears.

=== Tale about Ulsanbawi ===
Thousands of years after Ulsanbawi stayed in Mt. Seorak, Joseon (朝鮮) period, there was a temple under the Ulsanbawi. Someday, Ulsan reeve thought he had the right to have Ulsanbawi. He envied Ulsanbawi. He visited the temple and said "You have to pay a tax for Ulsanbawi, or your temple will be closed."

That made the temple poor. The new chief monk tried hard abolish reeve's unfair order. He didn't eat for few days to think of a way. Then a child monk asked him why, as it worried him. After the child listened to the story, he said he had a solution.

He said to Ulsan reeve "We don't need the Ulsanbawi. It is a burden to us. So you have to pay a tax to us, instead of us paying a tax to you. If you can't, you have to move the Ulsanbawi to Ulsan." Reeve said "Then you have to tie up the bawi with burnt rope so that we can take Ulsanbawi to Ulsan. We'll take it then."

The chief thought it was impossible. But the child said that they didn't need to worry. He employed young men to make a rope. He soaked the rope in salt water. Then he tied up the Ulsanbawi. Few days after he ignited the rope it looked totally burnt.

After a month reeve came and war surprised. He thought the monks would pay the tax but they were triumphant. He climbed up the mountain to check it is real. Of course it was real. Reeve sighed "They are so clever, I can't collect the tax no more." After that, the temple didn't need to pay the tax anymore.

== See also ==
- Seoraksan
- Sinheungsa
