= Demicryptochironomus paracamptolabis =

Scientific classification
- Domain: Eukaryota
- Kingdom: Animalia
- Phylum: Arthropoda
- Class: Insecta
- Order: Diptera
- Family: Chironomidae
- Genus: Demicryptochironomus
- Species: D. paracamptolabis

Binomial name
- Demicryptochironomus paracamptolabis Ree, 2012

Species of insect

Demicryptochironomus paracamptolabis is a species of non-biting midges in the bloodworm family Chironomidae.

The species was first described in 2012 by Han Il Ree.

The species is endemic to Korea, where it is seen in Muju, Jeollabuk-do.
