= Demicryptochironomus =

Scientific classification
- Kingdom: Animalia
- Phylum: Arthropoda
- Clade: Pancrustacea
- Class: Insecta
- Order: Diptera
- Family: Chironomidae
- Subfamily: Chironominae
- Tribe: Chironomini
- Genus: Demicryptochironomus; Lenz, 1941

Type species
- Demicryptochironomus vulneratus (Zetterstedt, 1838)

Subgenera
- Demicryptochironomus Lenz, 1941; Irmakia Reiss, 1988

Synonyms
- Irmakia Reiss, 1988; Schadinia Lipina, 1939

Genus of non-biting midges

Demicryptochironomus is a genus of non-biting midges in the family Chironomidae. There are more than 30 described species in Demicryptochironomus.

The genus was first described by Lenz in 1941, and the type species is Demicryptochironomus vulneratus.

== Species ==
These 33 species belong to the genus Demicryptochironomus:

- Demicryptochironomus americana
- Demicryptochironomus antennarius Yan, Tang & Wang, 2005
- Demicryptochironomus asamaprimus Sasa, 1991
- Demicryptochironomus banepae Reiss, 1988
- Demicryptochironomus chuncheonensis Ree & Jeong, 2010
- Demicryptochironomus cinereithorax (Goetghebuer, 1934)
- Demicryptochironomus clarilatus (Guha & Chaudhuri, 1981)
- Demicryptochironomus concavus Yan, Tang & Wang, 2005
- Demicryptochironomus constrictus Yan, Tang & Wang, 2005
- Demicryptochironomus cuneatus (Townes, 1945)
- Demicryptochironomus dividuus Mukherjee & Hazra, 2022
- Demicryptochironomus evgeniii Zorina, 2004
- Demicryptochironomus fastigatus (Townes, 1945)
- Demicryptochironomus ginzancedeus Sasa & Suzuki, 2001
- Demicryptochironomus irioabeus (Sasa & Suzuki, 2000)
- Demicryptochironomus latior Reiss, 1988
- Demicryptochironomus lobus (Yan, Saether, Jin & Wang, 2008)
- Demicryptochironomus lutoga Zorina, 2004
- Demicryptochironomus minus Yan, Tang & Wang, 2005
- Demicryptochironomus neglectus Reiss, 1988
- Demicryptochironomus oyabeprimus (Sasa, Kawai & Ueno, 1988)
- Demicryptochironomus pannus Yan, Tang & Wang, 2005
- Demicryptochironomus paracamptolabis Ree, 2012
- Demicryptochironomus praeacutus Mukherjee & Hazra, 2022
- Demicryptochironomus retusus Yan, Saether, Jin & Wang, 2008
- Demicryptochironomus schachti Reiss, 1988
- Demicryptochironomus spatulatus Wang & Zheng, 1994
- Demicryptochironomus tamacutus (Sasa, 1983)
- Demicryptochironomus uresicarinus Sasa, 1989
- Demicryptochironomus vulneratus (Zetterstedt, 1838)
- Demicryptochironomus wontongensis Ree, 2012
- Demicryptochironomus yui Yan, Tang & Wang, 2005
- Demicryptochironomus zairensis Lehmann, 1979
