= Seoraksan National Park =

National park in Gangwon Province, South Korea

- 설악산국립공원, 雪嶽山國立公園
- IUCN category II (national park)
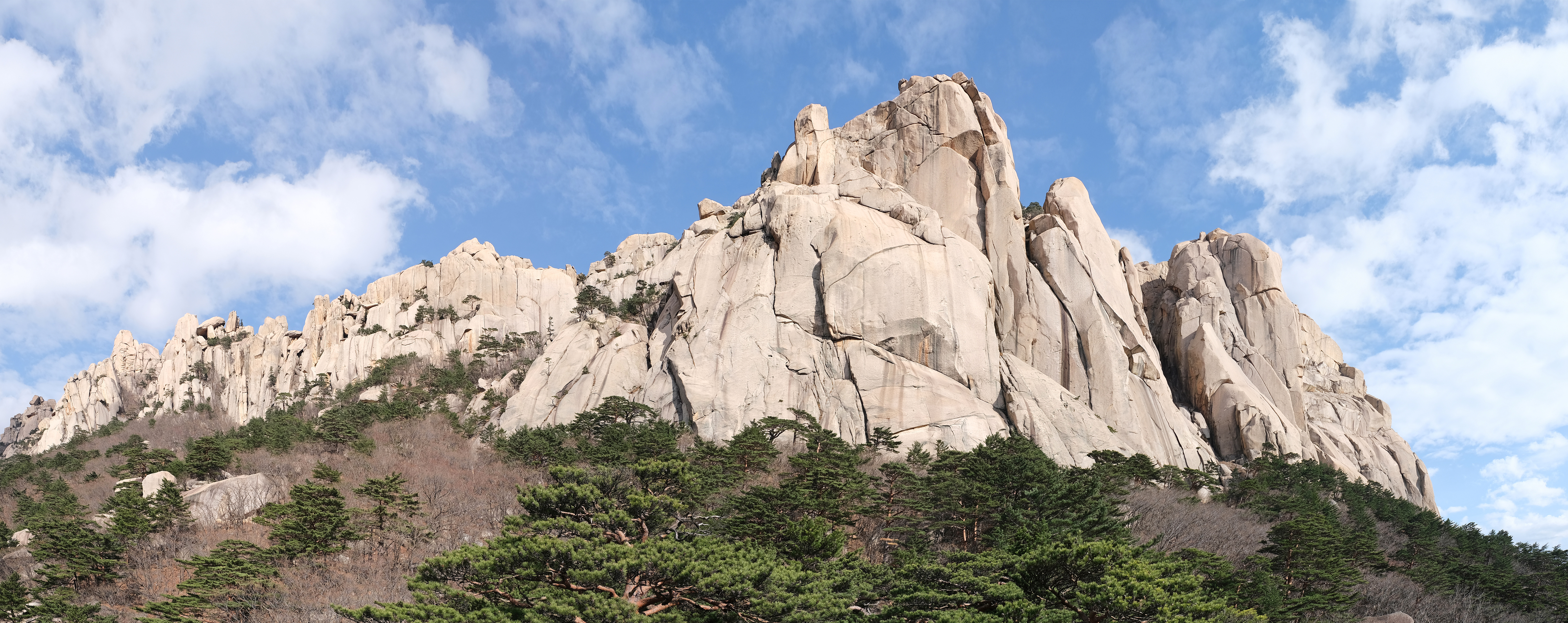
- Ulsanbawi is one of the primary attractions of Seoraksan, along with Heundeulbawi, Biryeong waterfall (비룡폭포), and Yukdam waterfall (육담 폭포).

- Location within South Korea
- Location: South Korea
- Coordinates: 38°07′30″N 128°24′58″E
- Area: 398.22 km^{2} (153.75 sq mi)
- Established: 24 March 1970
- Governing body: Korea National Park Service

Korean name
- Hangul: 설악산천연보호구역
- Hanja: 雪嶽山天然保護區域
- RR: Seoraksan cheonyeon boho guyeok
- MR: Sŏraksan ch'ŏnyŏn poho kuyŏk

The twenty-two national parks of South Korea.
Land-based parks are in red and marine parks are in blue.

Seoraksan National Park (Korean: 설악산국립공원) is a national park in South Korea. It is listed by the South Korean government with UNESCO as a tentative World Heritage Site. Located on the east-central Korean Peninsula, the park includes the Dinosaur Ridge, Injegun, Yanyanggun, and Sokchosi. It is popular with tourists and nature enthusiasts. It is home to many rare taxa of flora and fauna.

== Description ==
The reserve has an area of 163.6 square kilometres (63.2 sq mi) and includes many mountain peaks measuring over 1,200 metres above sea level, the tallest being Daecheongbong, at an altitude of 1,708 metres (5,604 ft). The ranges are composed largely of dissected granite and gneiss. The annual precipitation is about 1,000 mm (39 inches) in Inner Soraksan and 1,300 mm (51 inches) in Outer Soraksan, but most of it comes as heavy summer rains that may total several hundred millimeters in one day, and the occasional typhoon can bring over 100 mm in just one hour.

The park is valued for its floral diversity. There are about 1,013 species of plants known, with 822 vascular plant species. Pine trees such as the Siberian pine are abundant on the southern slope while the northern slopes of the mountain range are characterized by oaks and other deciduous trees. Thuja grow in the deep valleys. Dwarf pines and yews grow on low and high slopes. Juniper, hawthorn, and Manchurian fir can be found. Other plants include forsythias and saw-worts. Rare plants in the reserve include Hanabusaya asiatica.

1,562 animal species have been classified so far. Local fauna include otters, Siberian flying squirrel, kestrel, Chinese sparrowhawk, lenok, Chinese minnow, and spotted barbel. Endangered animal taxa include Tristram's woodpecker, Korean goral, and Korean musk deer.

Cultural landmarks in the reserve include the Buddhist temples Baekdamsa and Sinheungsa.

== History ==
The government designated the area as a nature reserve in 1965 and UNESCO designated it as a biosphere reserve in 1982. It was also the first Korean national park to be named under the National Park Law in 1970.

On 9–16 August 1991, the 17th World Jamboree was held in Mount Sorak. World Jamboree is the biggest event for boy/girl scouts and held every 4 years. In 1991 thousands of scouts from all over the world gathered in Mount Sorak to have fun in many activities and games, where they can exchange cultures, discuss environment or climate issues and create friendships.

== See also ==
- Seoraksan
