= Dinosaur Ridge (Alberta) =

Ridge in Alberta, Canada

- Location within Alberta

Highest point
- Listing: Mountains of Alberta
- Coordinates: 54°19′00″N 119°59′10″W

Geography
- Country: Canada
- Province: Alberta
- Protected area: Banff National Park

Dinosaur Ridge is a ridge in Alberta, Canada.

Dinosaur Ridge was so named on account of its dinosaur-shaped outline.
