= Bokgyesan =

Mountain in Cheorwon, South Korea

Coordinates: 38°12′N 127°30′E

Highest point
- Elevation: 1,054 m (3,458 ft)
- Listing: Mountains of Korea

Geography
- Country: South Korea

Korean name
- Hangul: 복계산
- Hanja: 福桂山
- RR: Bokgyesan
- MR: Pokkyesan

Bokgyesan (Korean: 복계산) is a mountain in Cheorwon County, Gangwon Province, South Korea. It has an elevation of 1,054 m (3,458 ft).
