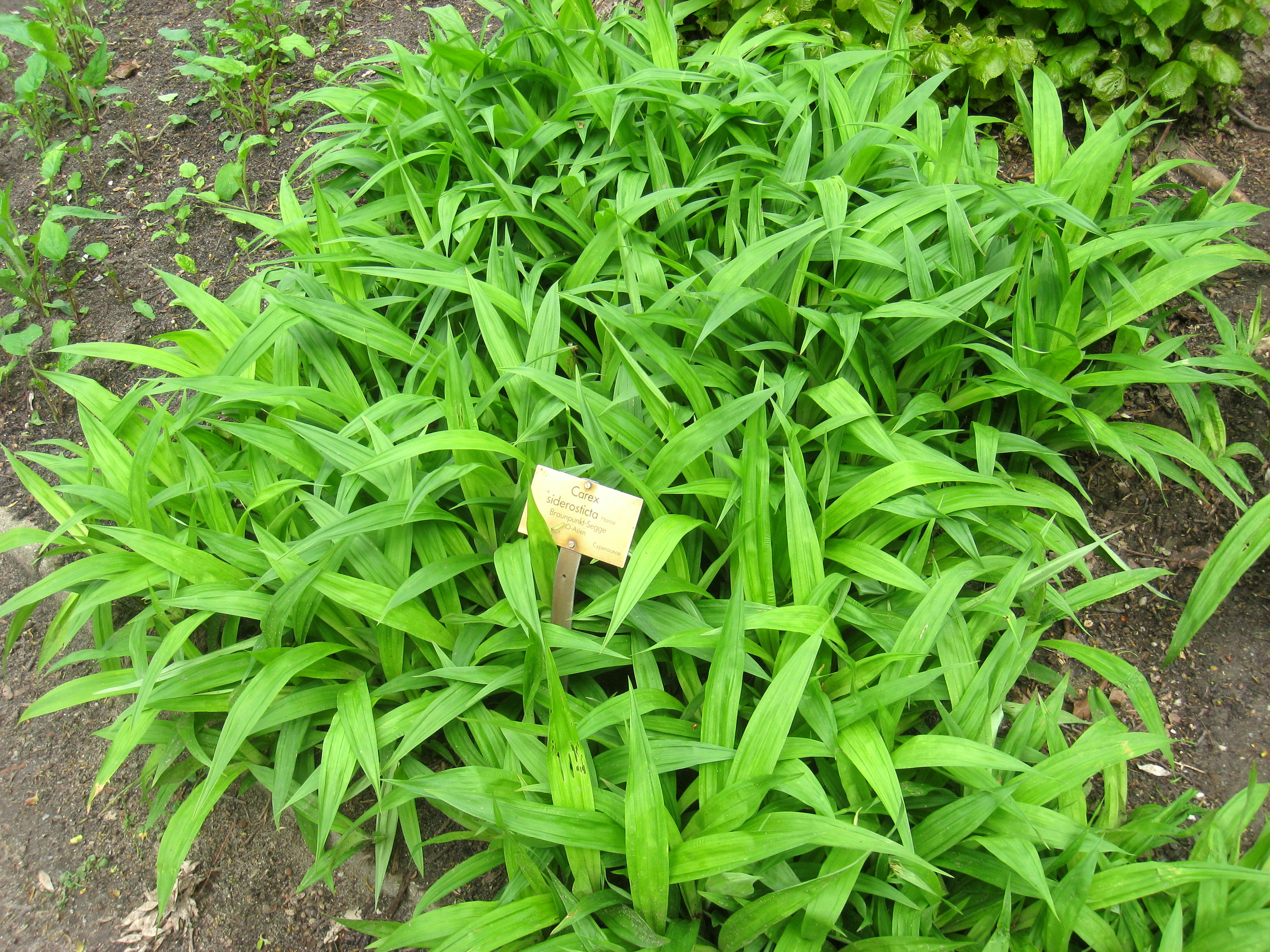

Scientific classification
- Kingdom: Plantae
- Clade: Tracheophytes
- Clade: Angiosperms
- Clade: Monocots
- Clade: Commelinids
- Order: Poales
- Family: Cyperaceae
- Genus: Carex
- Subgenus: Carex subg. Siderosticta
- Species: C. siderosticta

Binomial name
- Carex siderosticta Hance

Synonyms
- Carex ciliatomarginata Nakai; Carex platyphylla Franch.; Carex siderosticta f. albomarginata Y.N.Lee; Carex siderosticta var. stenophylla (Kitag.) Kitag.; Pseudocarex plantaginea Miq.

= Carex siderosticta =

Species of grass-like plant

Carex siderosticta is a species of sedge native to East Asia. It is the only species of Carex known to produce "pseudo-lateral" culms, which appear to be lateral, but derive from the apical meristem. It is the type species of Carex subg. Siderosticta.
