= Seoraksan =

Third tallest mountain in South Korea

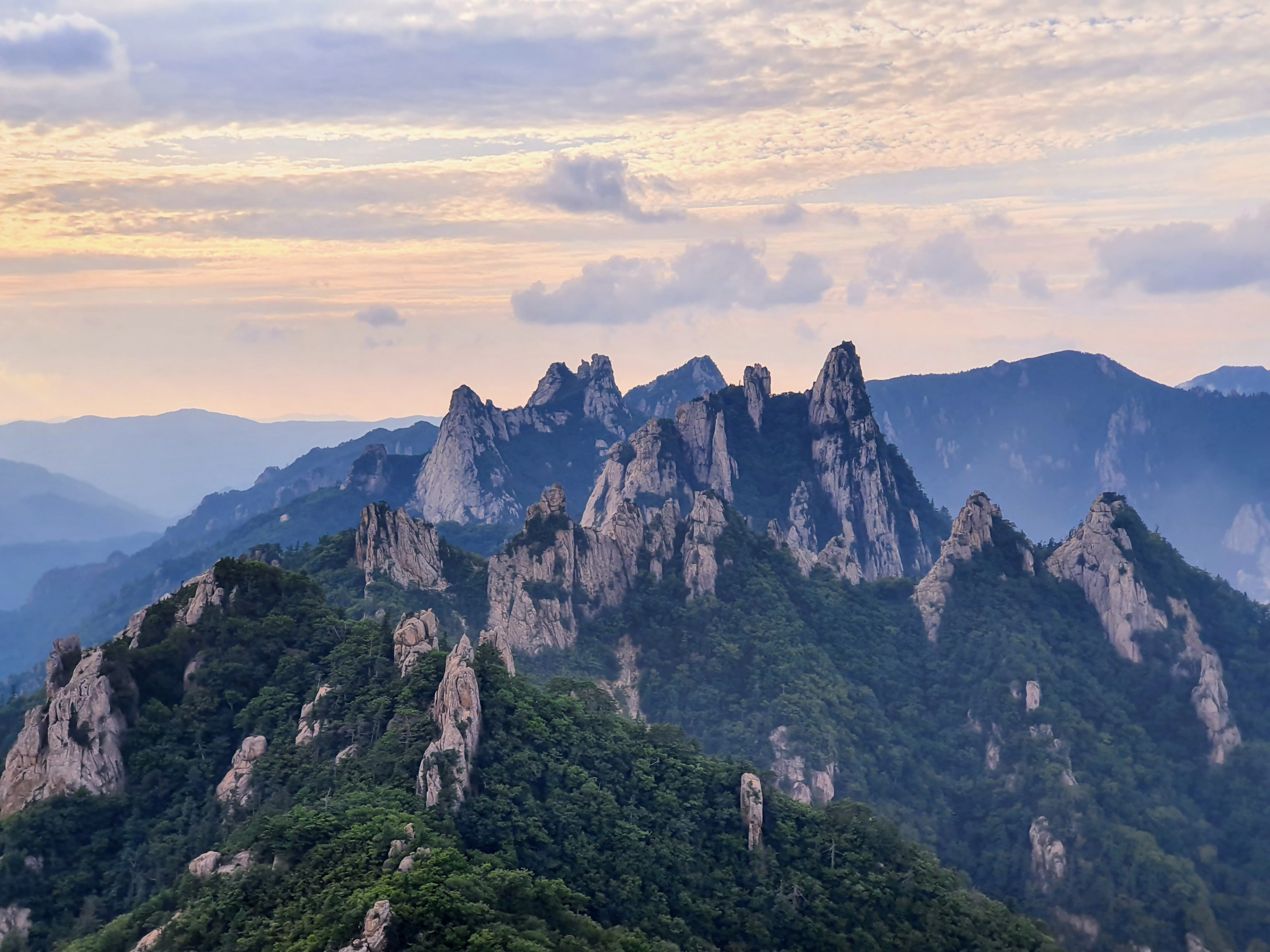
- The Dinosaur Ridge of Seoraksan

Highest point
- Elevation: 1,708 m (5,604 ft)
- Prominence: 1,201 m (3,940 ft)
- Listing: Ribu
- Coordinates: 38°7′10″N 128°27′56″E

Geography
- Location: South Korea
- Parent range: Taebaek Mountains

Climbing
- Easiest route: Hike, scramble

Korean name
- Hangul: 설악산
- Hanja: 雪嶽山
- RR: Seoraksan
- MR: Sŏraksan

Seoraksan (Korean: 설악산), or Mount Sorak, is the highest mountain in the Taebaek mountain range in the Gangwon Province in eastern South Korea. It is located in the Seoraksan National Park, near Sokcho. After the Hallasan volcano on Jeju Island and Jirisan in the south, Seoraksan is the third highest mountain in South Korea. The peak Daechongbong (대청봉) of Seoraksan reaches 1,708 meters (5,603 feet). The mountain is sometimes considered the backbone of South Korea.

The mountain is also part of a biosphere reserve: Mount Sorak Biosphere Reserve.

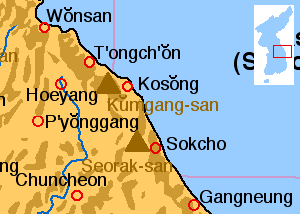
Location of Seoraksan.

== Geography ==
Seoraksan is divided into Naeseorak (Inner Seorak), Oaeseorak (Outer Seorak), and Namseorak (South Seorak).

=== Naeseorak (Inner Seorak) ===
The area belonging to Inje-gun in the northwest. Daecheong-bong ou Daecheong Peak is called Naeseolak.

Naeseorak includes various features, such as Baekdam Valley, Gaya-dong Valley, Gugokdam Valley, 12 Seonnyeondang, Daeseung Falls and Yonga-jangseong (Fortress of dragon's teeth). In addition to Cheonbul-dong Valley, it is easy to access Ulsan Rock, Gwongeumseong Fortress, Geumgang Cave, Biryong Falls, and Toseong Falls.

=== Oeseorak (Outer Seorak) ===
Oeseorak (Korean: 외설악; Hanja: 外雪嶽) is the area belonging to Sokcho towards the east. It features easier hiking courses and is one of the most accessed areas of the park.

In Oeseorak, there is the Towangseong Waterfall, the highest waterfall in South Korea.

== Mountain geography, fauna and flora ==
It was designated as Natural Monument No.171 in 1965, and as a national park (Mount Seorak national park) on March 24, 1970. In August 1982, UNESCO designated the area as a biosphere reserve.

The biosphere of Mt. Seorak is composed of different ecosystems due to a variety of climates and geographic characteristics. Its inland climate is composed of gentle slopes and thick soil layers supporting abundant forests and animal habitats. The mountain outcrop is a marine climate with steep ground. It attracts few visitors, but is home to rare animals and plants such as the long-tailed goral and the Asian black bear, both of which as been designated as South Korean natural monuments.

=== Taxa named after Seoraksan ===
- Pagaronia seolagsana Kwon, 1983 (a cicada)
- Cacopsylla seolagsana (Kwon, 1983)
- Amynthas seoraksan iti Blakemore, 2015 (annelid)
- Fridericia seoraksani Christensen & Dózsa-Farkas, 2012 (annelid)
- Amynthas seoraksan seoraksan Blakemore, 2015 (annelid)

== Hiking paths ==
=== Outer Seorak District ===
The Yukdam waterfall and the Biryeong waterfall (비룡폭포) are located on the southern side of the valley (Sangcheon river), about a forty-minute walk from the main car park.

==== Ulsanbawi ====
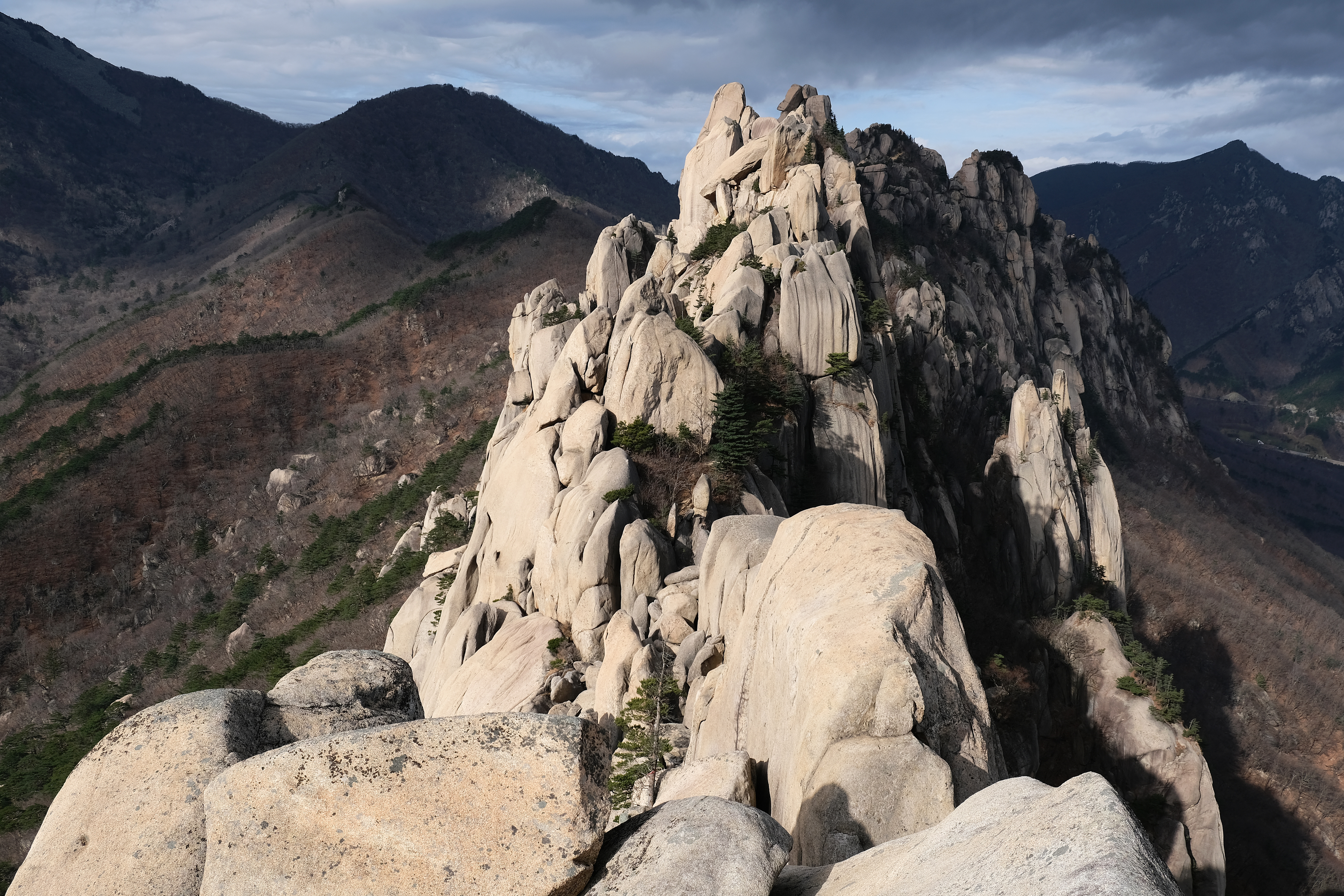
Ulsan-bawi

Ulsanbawi (울산바위) is a uniquely shaped rock formation within Seoraksan national park. Visitors can reach Ulsanbawi by taking a hiking path which includes climbing over 800 steps (888 steps according to locals). Along this path, visitors also pass two temples and a spherical rock (Heundeulbawi, 흔들바위) which sits on top of a larger rock. Heundeulbawi is about 5 meters (16 feet) high and can be shaken with some effort. Thousands of people have tried to push Heundeulbawi off its base rock, but nobody gets further than waggling the rock.

According to legend, Ulsanbawi comes from the city Ulsan in the south east of Korea. As Mount Kumgang (금강산) was built, Ulsanbawi walked to the north as the representative of the city. Unfortunately, Ulsanbawi arrived too late and there was no more room. Ulsanbawi was ashamed and slowly trudged back to the south. One evening the rock went to sleep in the Seorak area. Ulsanbawi felt it was so beautiful around there that it decided to stay for good.

At the end of the main valley is Biseondae, a rock platform in a stream. Above the stream is a difficult to reach cave, which offers clear views of the surrounding rock formations.

A bit farther from the entrance is the Valley of a Thousand Buddhas (천불동계곡), the primary valley of Seorak Mountain, also sometimes referred to as Seorak Valley. The valley was so named because the rock formations that line its sides resemble a line-up of Buddha statues.

=== Dinosaur Ridge ===
The Dinosaur Ridge (공룡능선) in Seoraksan extends from Madeungyeong to Sinseonam. It is one of Korea's cultural scenic treasures, designated as the 103rd treasure in 2013. The peaks of the ridge resemble the back of a spiked dinosaur, giving it its name. The course is strenuous: it starts at either the Madeungyeong pass or Huiwoongak shelter, meaning that just accessing the ridge involves a difficult climb. The ridge itself is listed on signs in the park as a 5 hour hike over the course of 5.1 kilometers. This can lead to a 10+ hour traverse from the eastern park entrance. The Dinosaur Ridge is listed among the most difficult mountain courses in Korea. With its remote location, steep slopes, and areas requiring scrambling, accidents due to exhaustion are common, especially in winter and during rainy weather. One incident in December 1993 left 2 university students dead after they lost their way at night and experienced hypothermia.

== Gallery ==
Seoraksan National Park

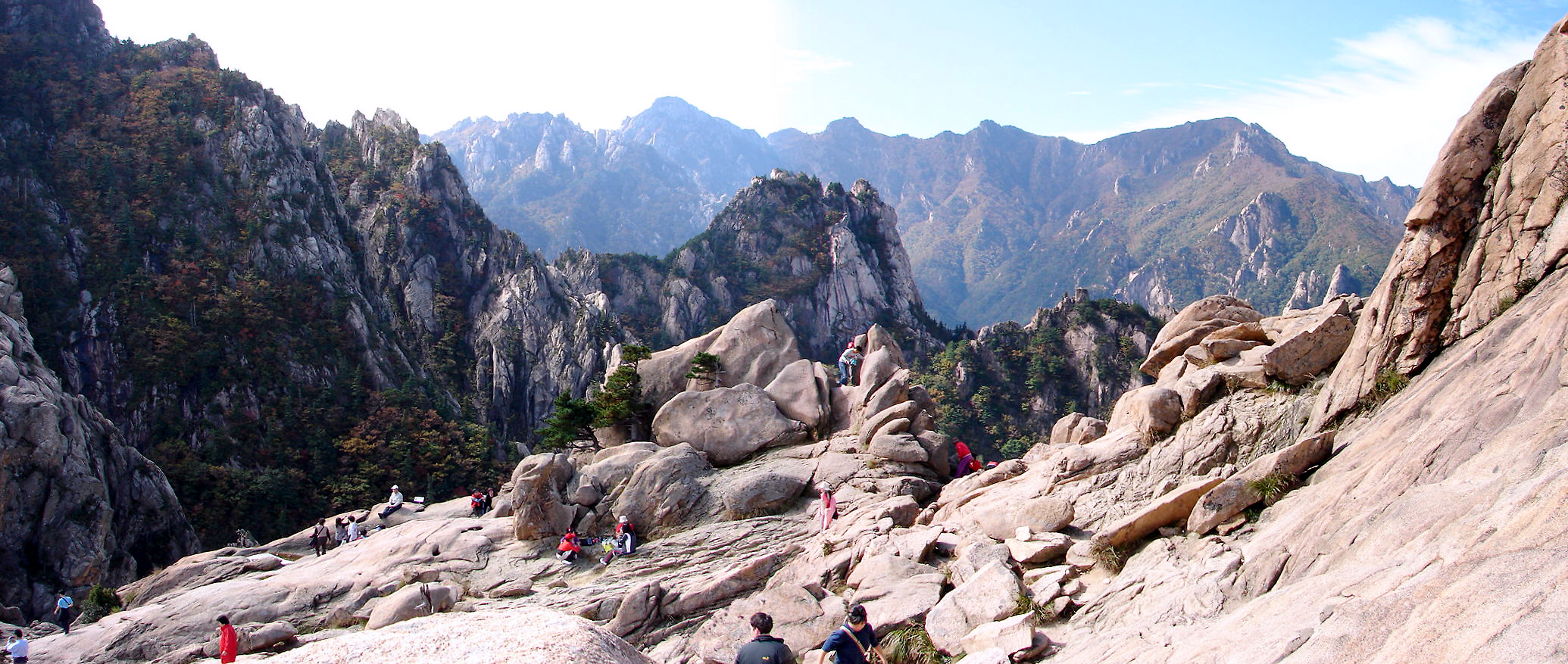
Mount Gwonggeumseong

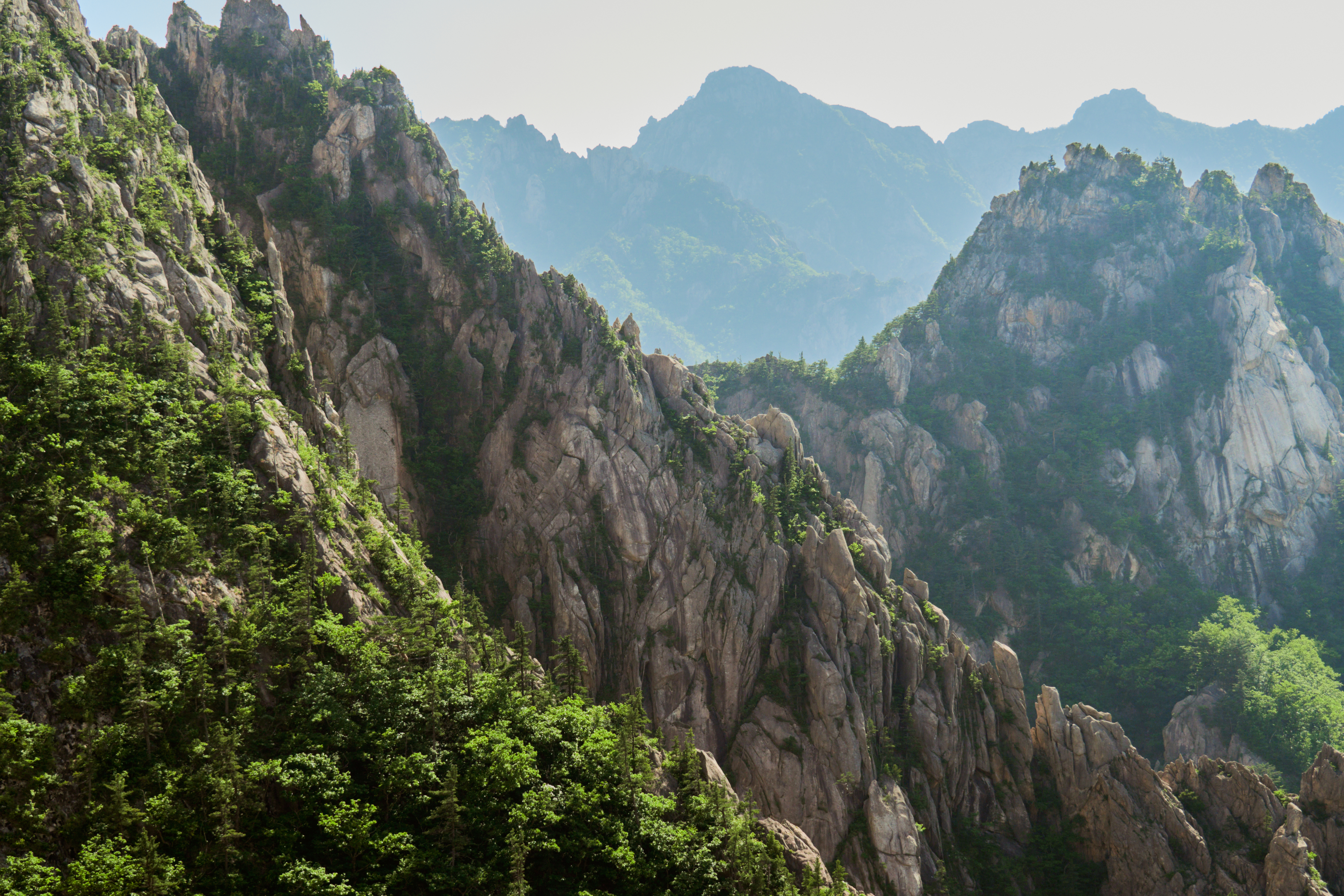
Granite peaks and ridgelines of Seoraksan National Park, with forested slopes in the foreground and layered mountain ranges receding into the background.

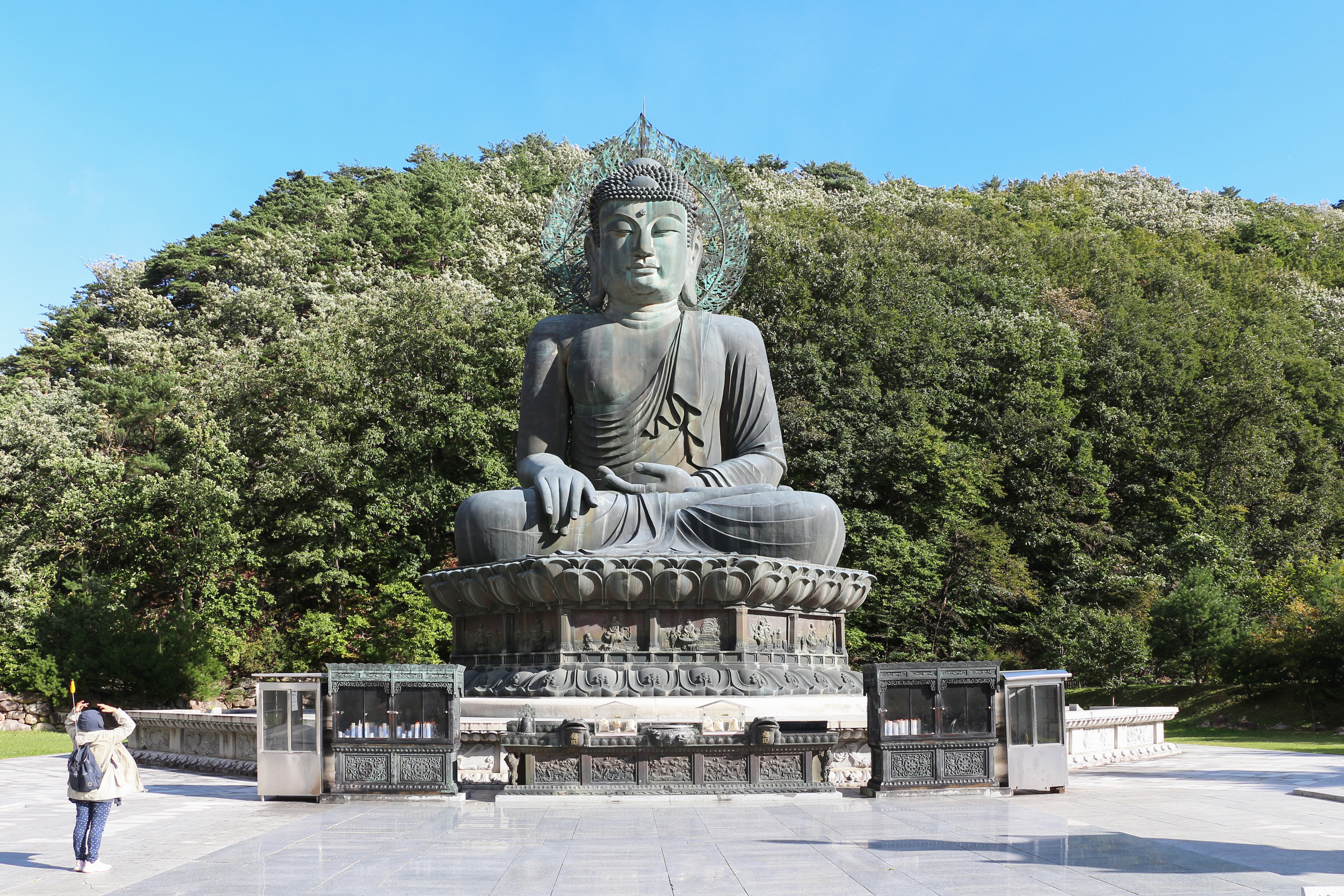
Bronze Buddha of Sinheungsa (Buddhist Temple) near the main entrance to the park.

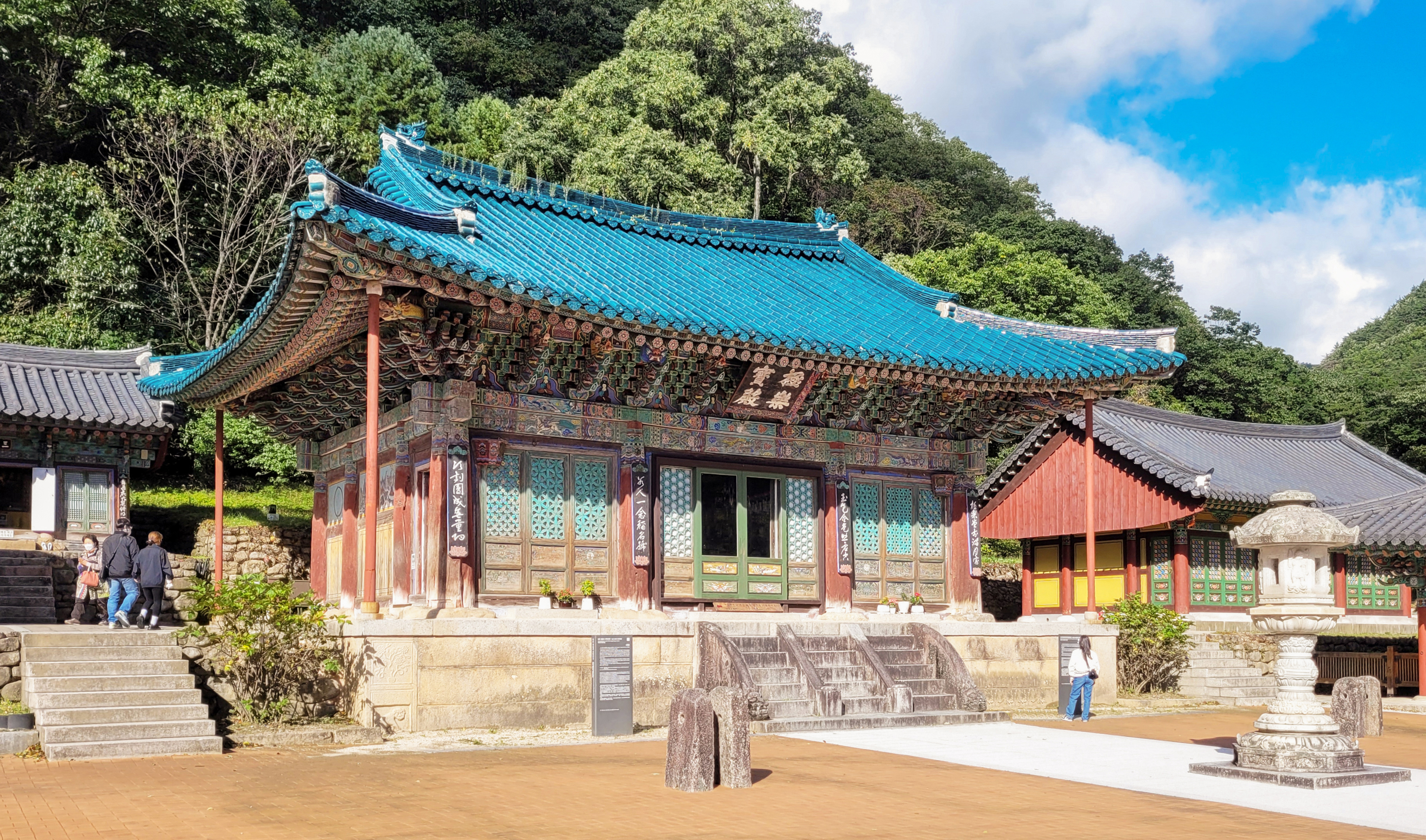
Sinheungsa (Buddhist Temple)

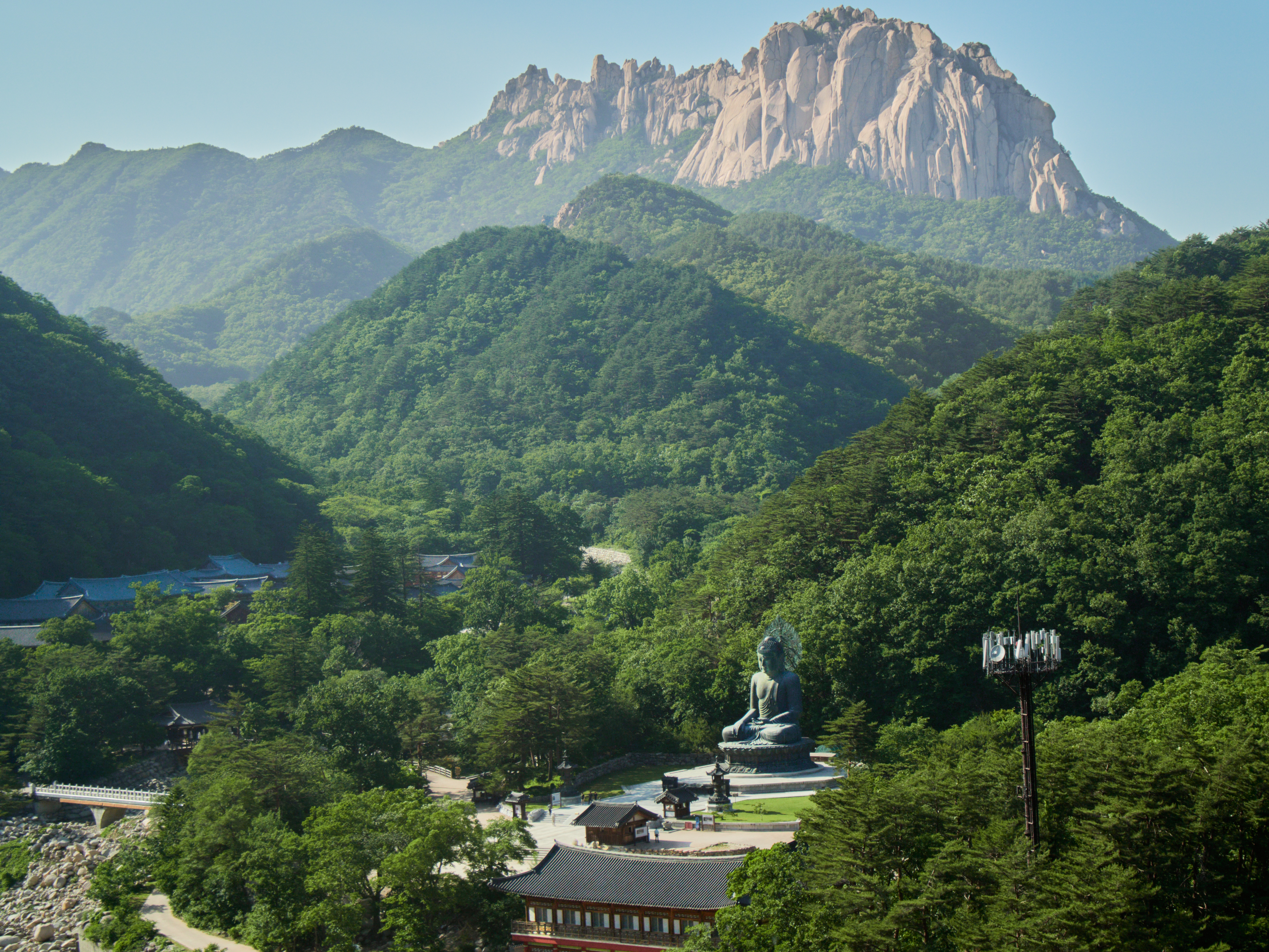
Aerial view of Sinheungsa Temple complex with a large seated bronze Buddha statue, surrounded by forest within Seoraksan National Park.

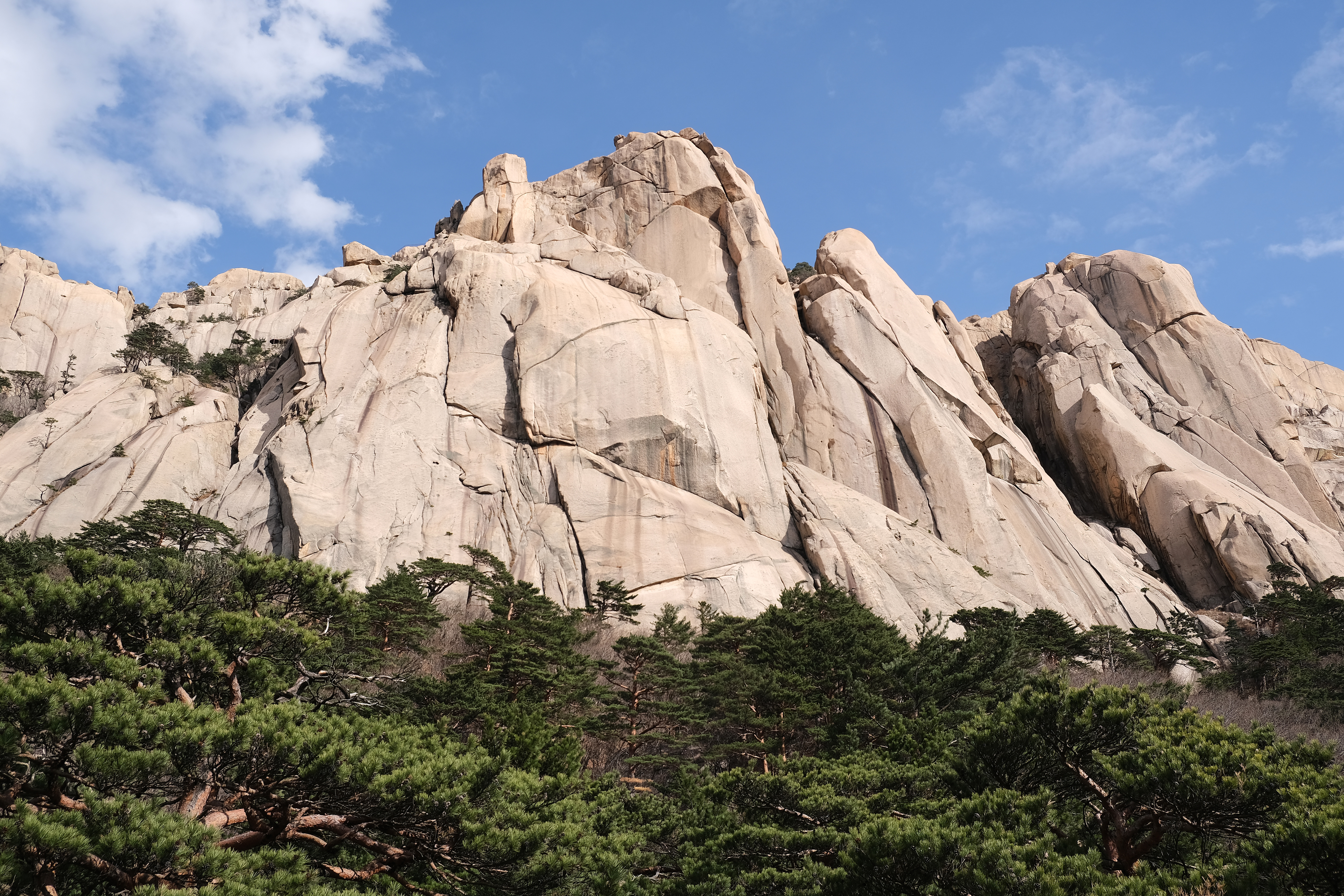
Ulsanbawi (peak)

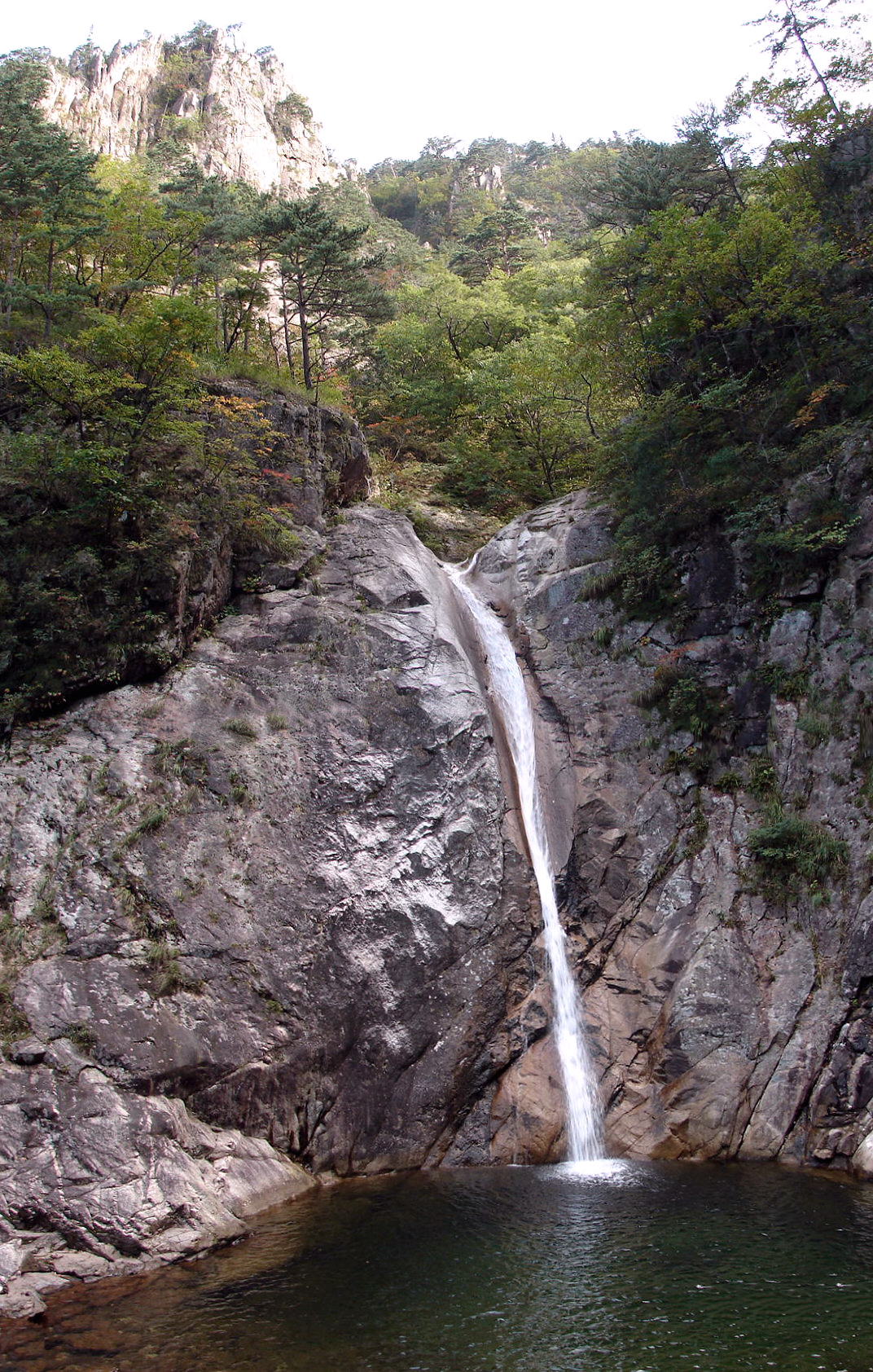
Biryong (Flying Dragon) Waterfalls

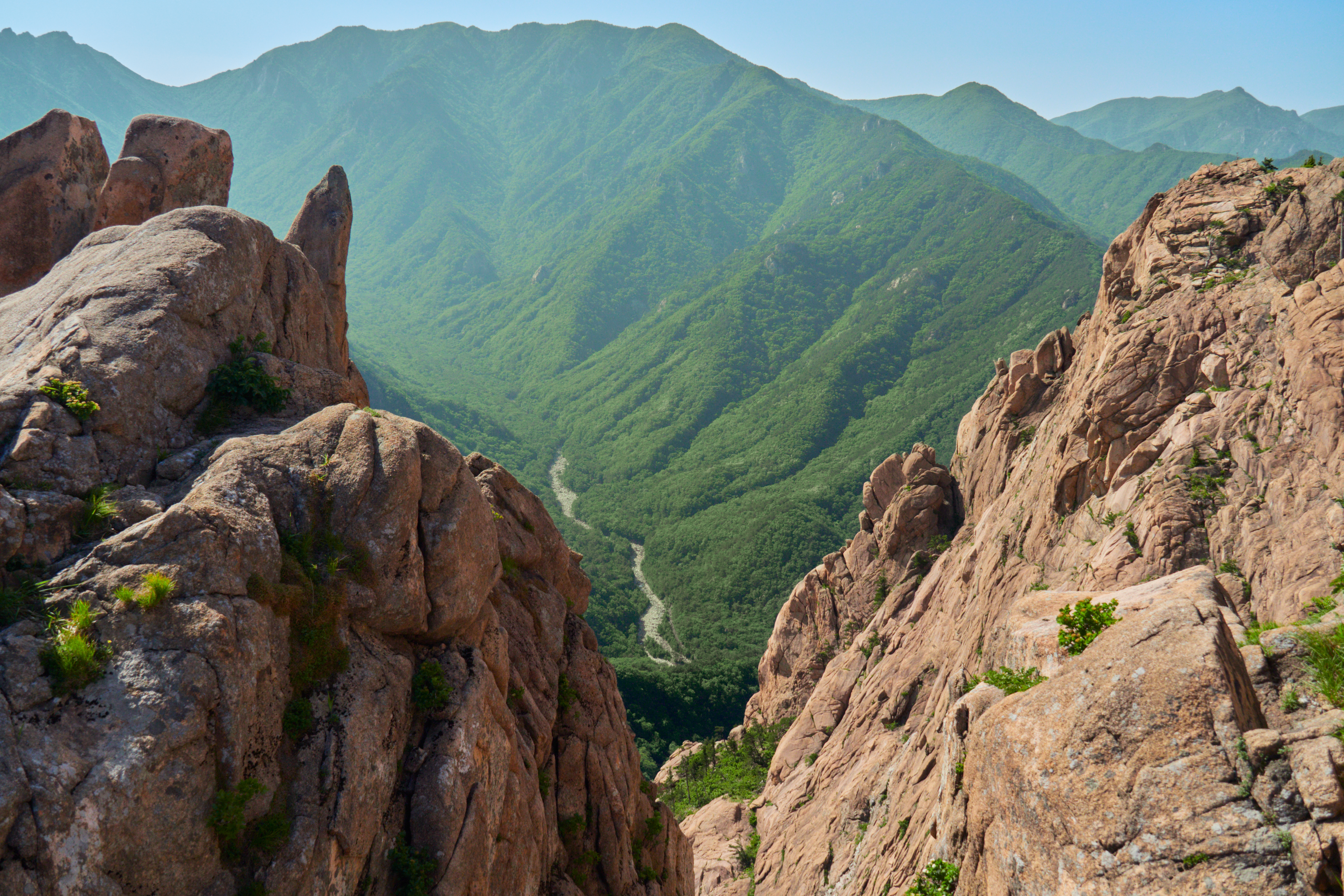
Rocky granite outcroppings framing a forested valley in Seoraksan National Park.

Heundeulbawi (Rocking stone) at Kyejo-am

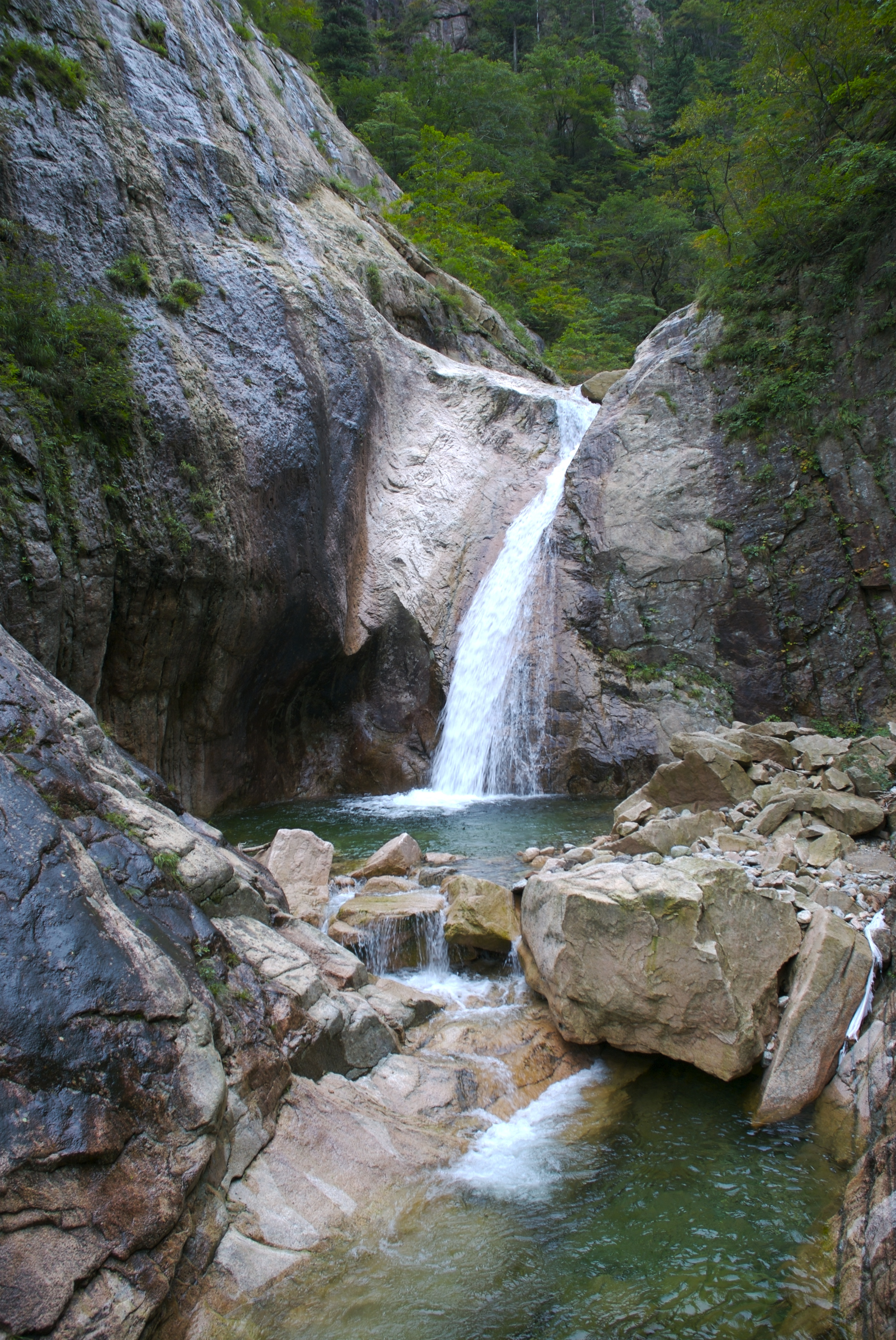
Cheondang Waterfall

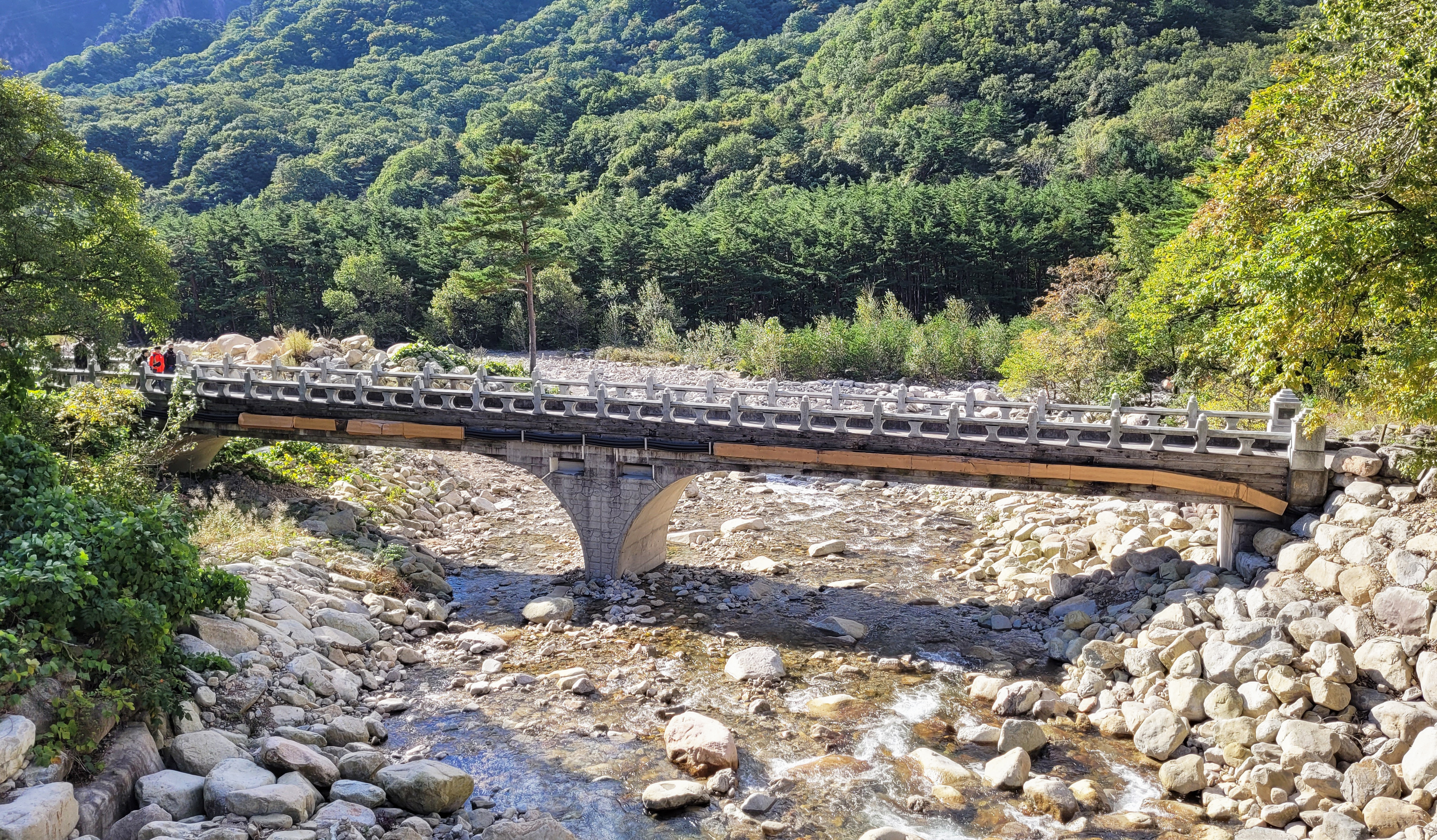
Footbridge

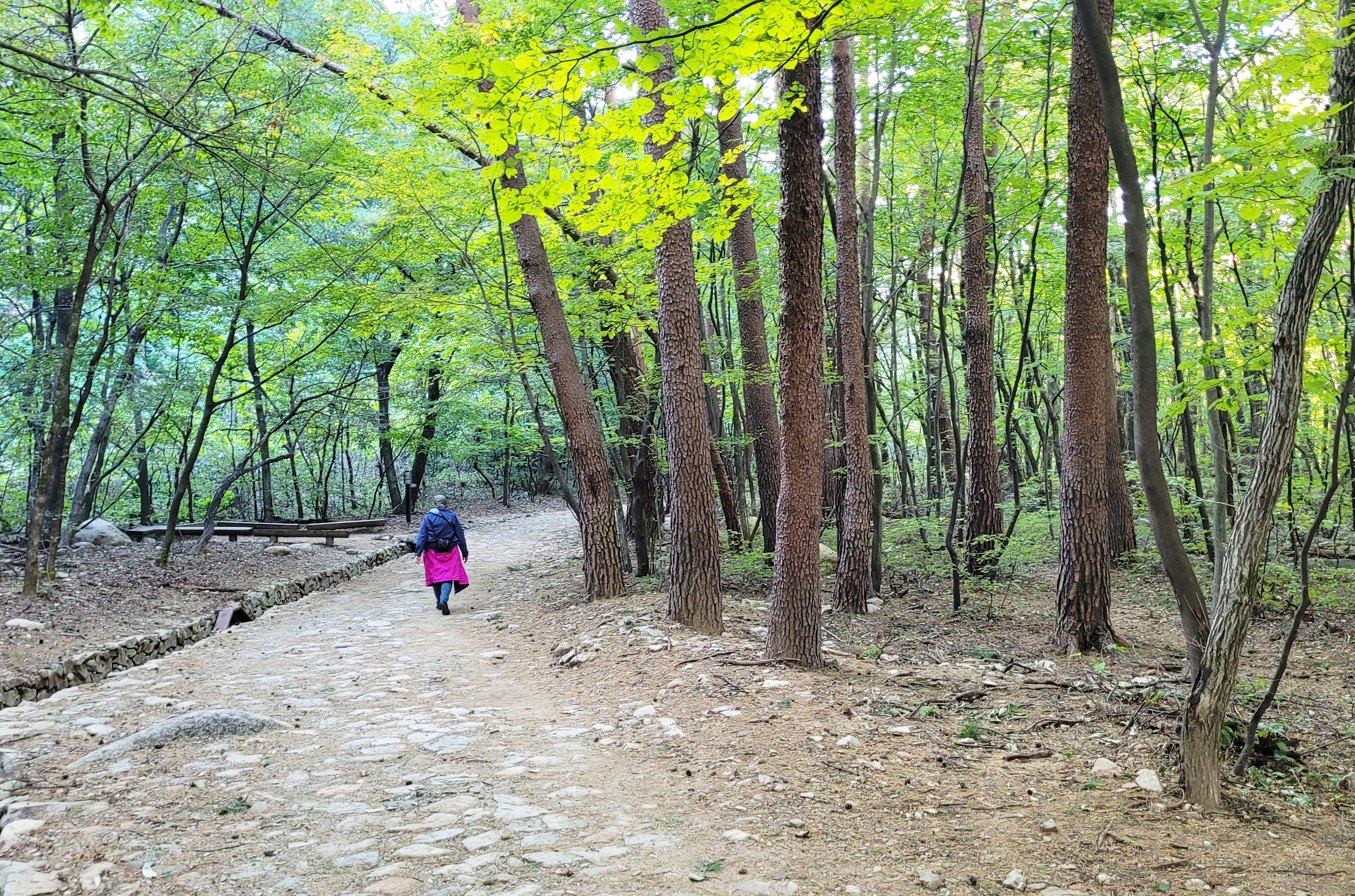
Trail in the park

Seoraksan Cable Car

== See also ==
- List of mountains in Korea
- Geography of South Korea
