= Stenochironomus colei =

Scientific classification
- Domain: Eukaryota
- Kingdom: Animalia
- Phylum: Arthropoda
- Class: Insecta
- Order: Diptera
- Family: Chironomidae
- Tribe: Chironomini
- Genus: Stenochironomus
- Species: S. colei

Binomial name
- Stenochironomus colei (Malloch, 1919)

Synonyms
- Chironomus colei Malloch, 1919

Species of fly

Stenochironomus colei is a species of midge in the family Chironomidae.
