= Stenochironomus macateei =

Scientific classification
- Domain: Eukaryota
- Kingdom: Animalia
- Phylum: Arthropoda
- Class: Insecta
- Order: Diptera
- Family: Chironomidae
- Tribe: Chironomini
- Genus: Stenochironomus
- Species: S. macateei

Binomial name
- Stenochironomus macateei (Malloch, 1915)

Synonyms
- Chironomus macateei Malloch, 1915

Species of fly

Stenochironomus macateei is a species of midge in the family Chironomidae.
