= Stenochironomus pulchripennis =

Scientific classification
- Domain: Eukaryota
- Kingdom: Animalia
- Phylum: Arthropoda
- Class: Insecta
- Order: Diptera
- Family: Chironomidae
- Genus: Stenochironomus
- Species: S. pulchripennis

Binomial name
- Stenochironomus pulchripennis (Coquillett, 1902)

Synonyms
- Chironomus pulchripennis Coquillett, 1902

Species of fly

Stenochironomus pulchripennis is a species of midge in the family Chironomidae.
