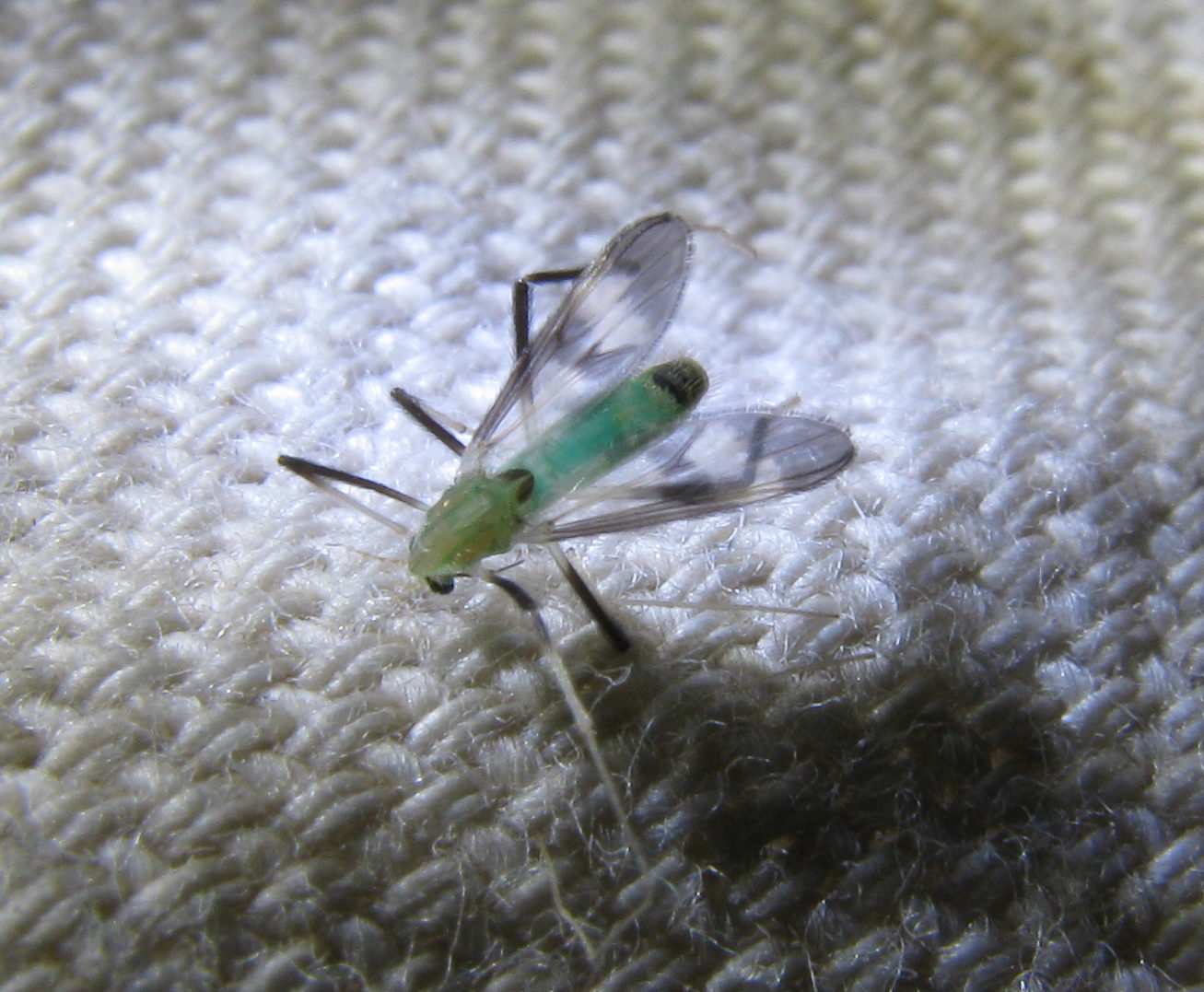

Scientific classification
- Kingdom: Animalia
- Phylum: Arthropoda
- Clade: Pancrustacea
- Class: Insecta
- Order: Diptera
- Family: Chironomidae
- Tribe: Chironomini
- Genus: Stenochironomus
- Species: S. hilaris

Binomial name
- Stenochironomus hilaris (Walker, 1848)

Synonyms
- Chironomus exquisitus Mitchell, 1908; Chironomus hilaris Walker, 1848; Chironomus nephopterus Mitchell, 1908; Chironomus taeniapennis Coquillett, 1901; Chironomus zonopterus Mitchell, 1908; Stenochironomus taeniapennis Coquillett, 1901

= Stenochironomus hilaris =

Species of fly

Stenochironomus hilaris is a species of midge in the family Chironomidae.
