= Stenochironomus poecilopterus =

Scientific classification
- Domain: Eukaryota
- Kingdom: Animalia
- Phylum: Arthropoda
- Class: Insecta
- Order: Diptera
- Family: Chironomidae
- Tribe: Chironomini
- Genus: Stenochironomus
- Species: S. poecilopterus

Binomial name
- Stenochironomus poecilopterus (Mitchell, 1908)

Synonyms
- Chironomus poecilopterus Mitchell, 1908

Species of fly

Stenochironomus poecilopterus is a species of midge in the family Chironomidae.
