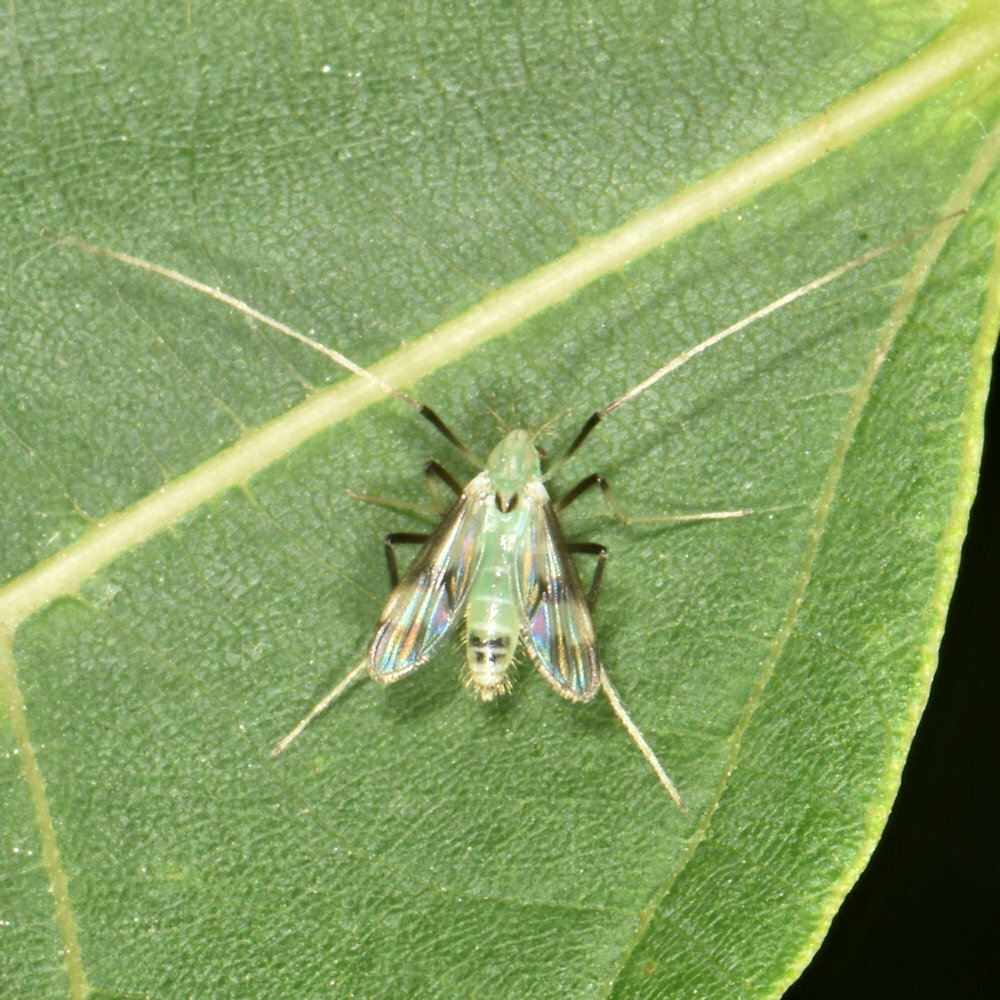
- Stenochironomus hilaris, Canada

Scientific classification
- Kingdom: Animalia
- Phylum: Arthropoda
- Clade: Pancrustacea
- Class: Insecta
- Order: Diptera
- Family: Chironomidae
- Subfamily: Chironominae
- Tribe: Chironomini
- Genus: Stenochironomus; Kieffer, 1919

Subgenera
- Chaetocladius; Petalopholeus Borkent, 1984; Stenochironomus Kieffer, 1919

= Stenochironomus =

Genus of non-biting midges

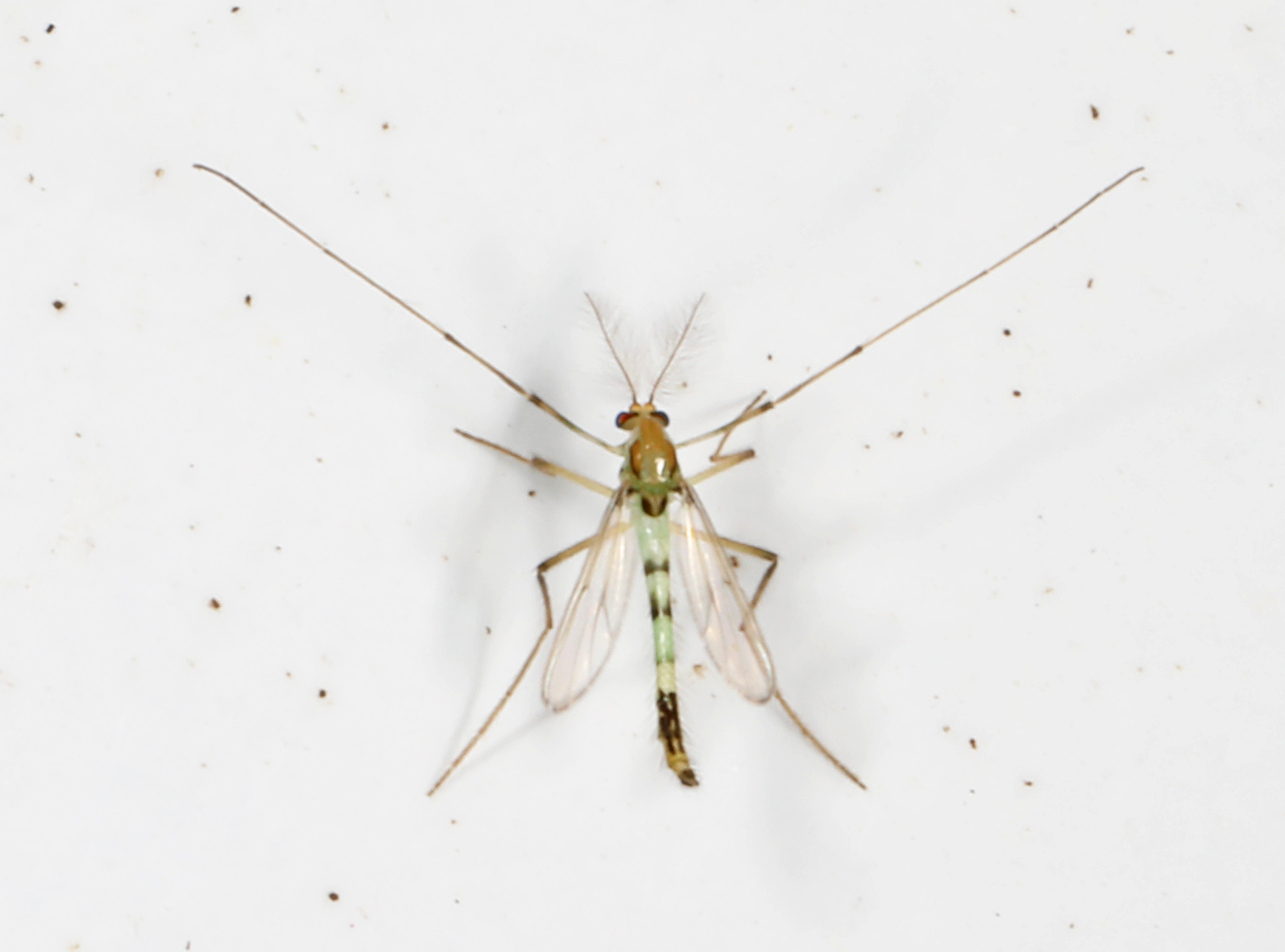
Stenochironomus aestivalis, Florida

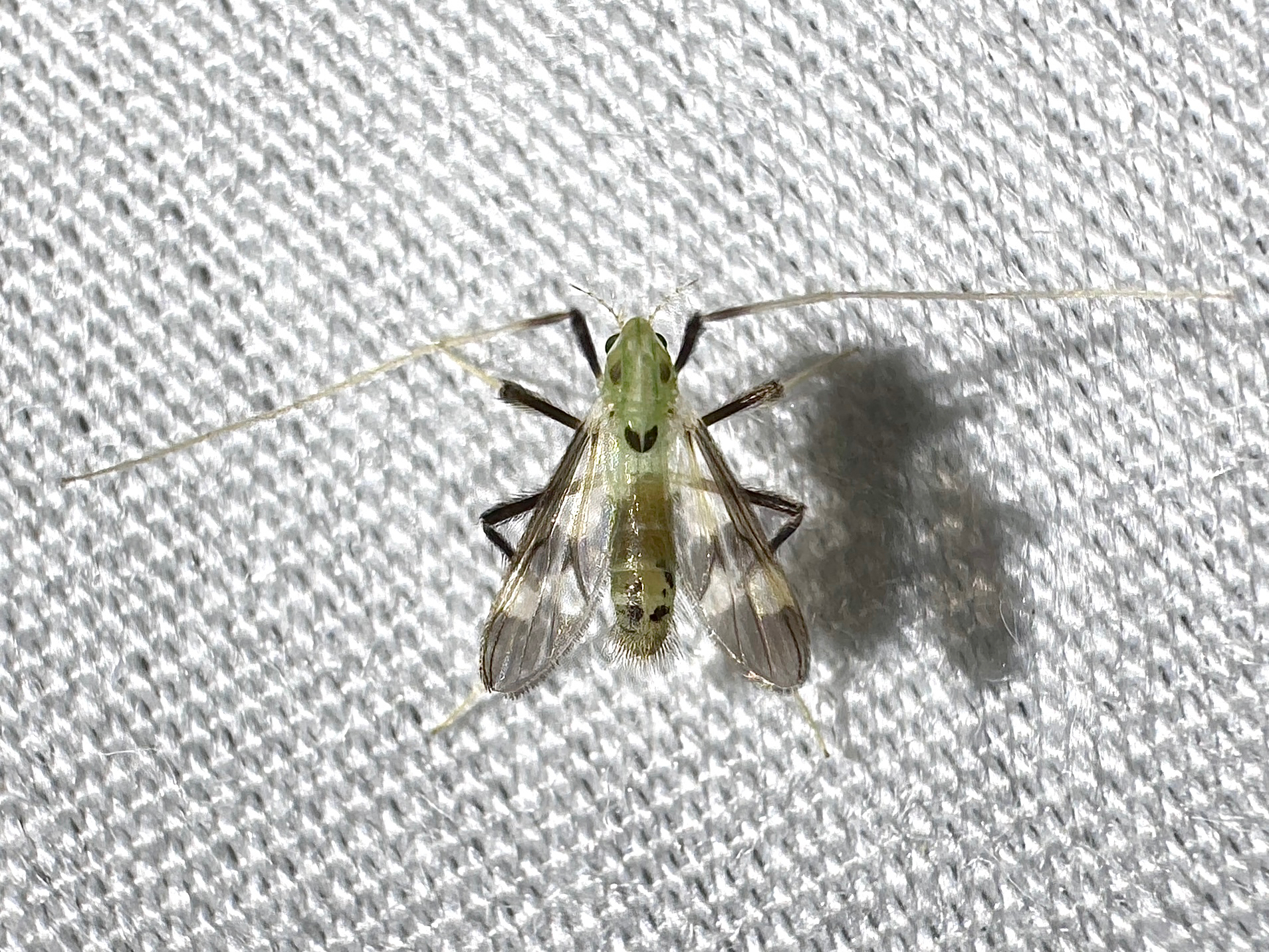
Stenochironomus albipalpus, New Jersey

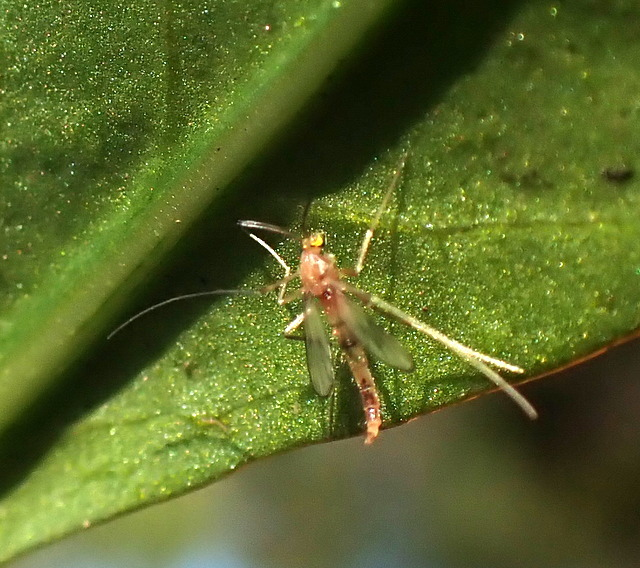
Stenochironomus browni, Florida

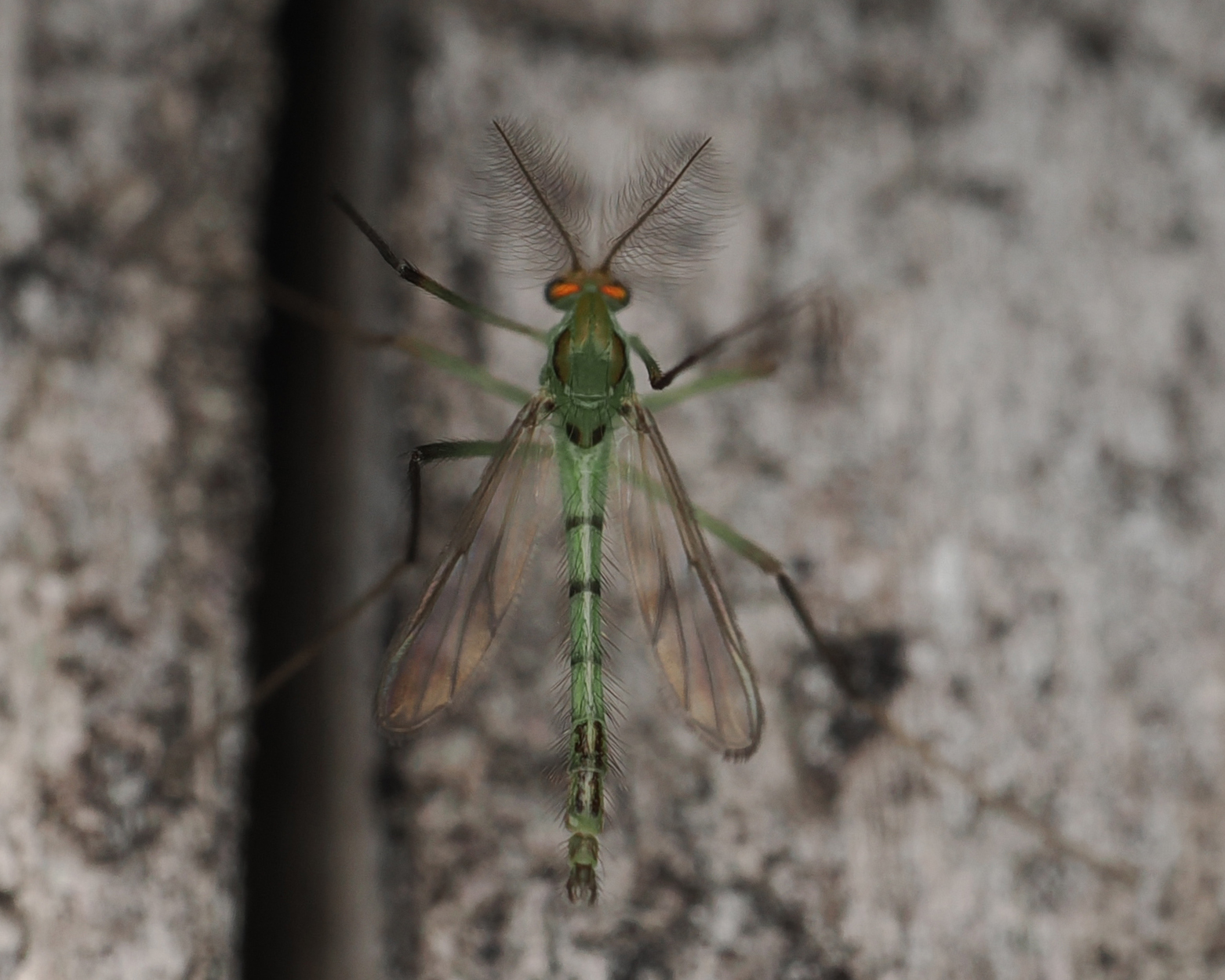
Stenochironomus cinctus, Maine

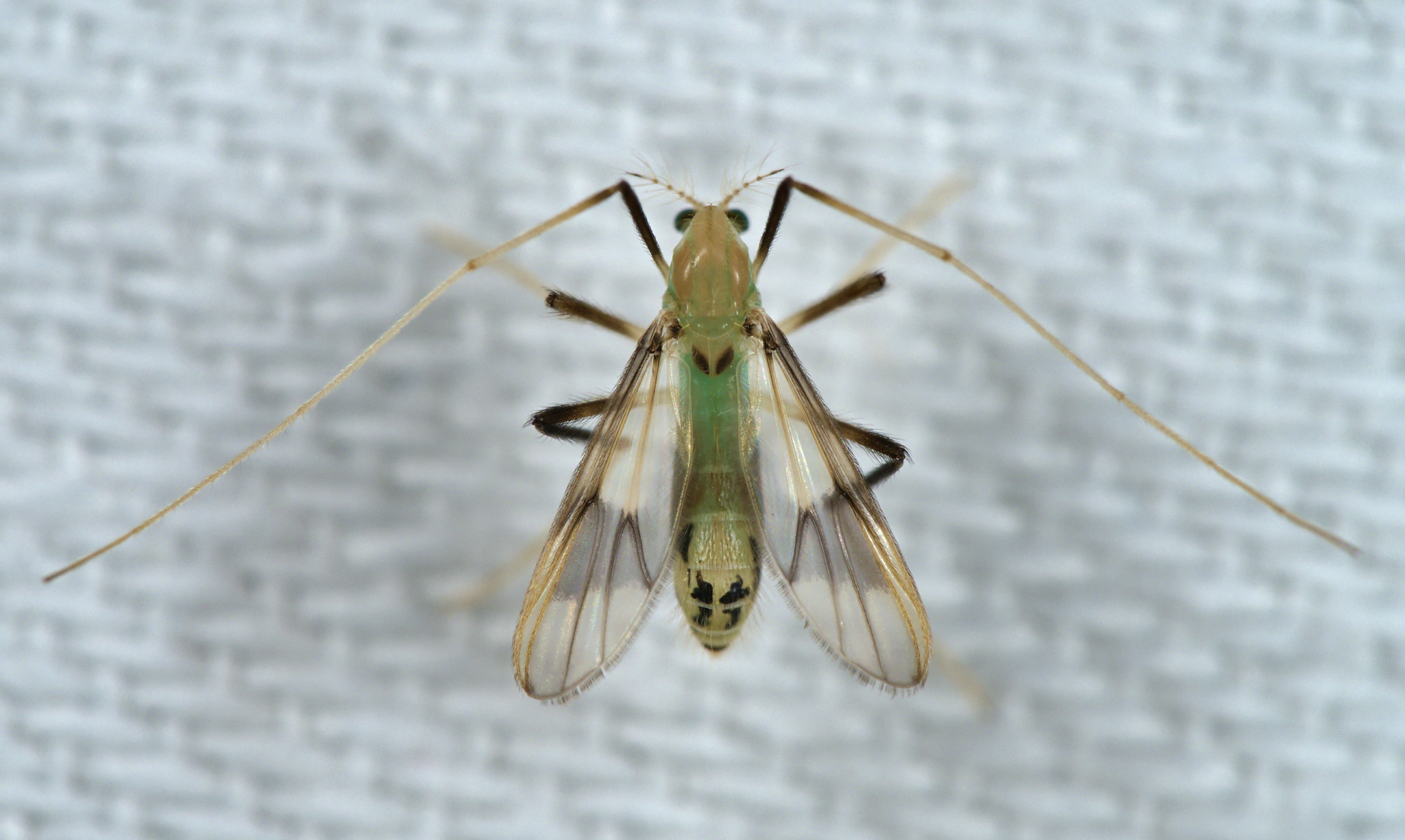
Stenochironomus gibbus, Belgium

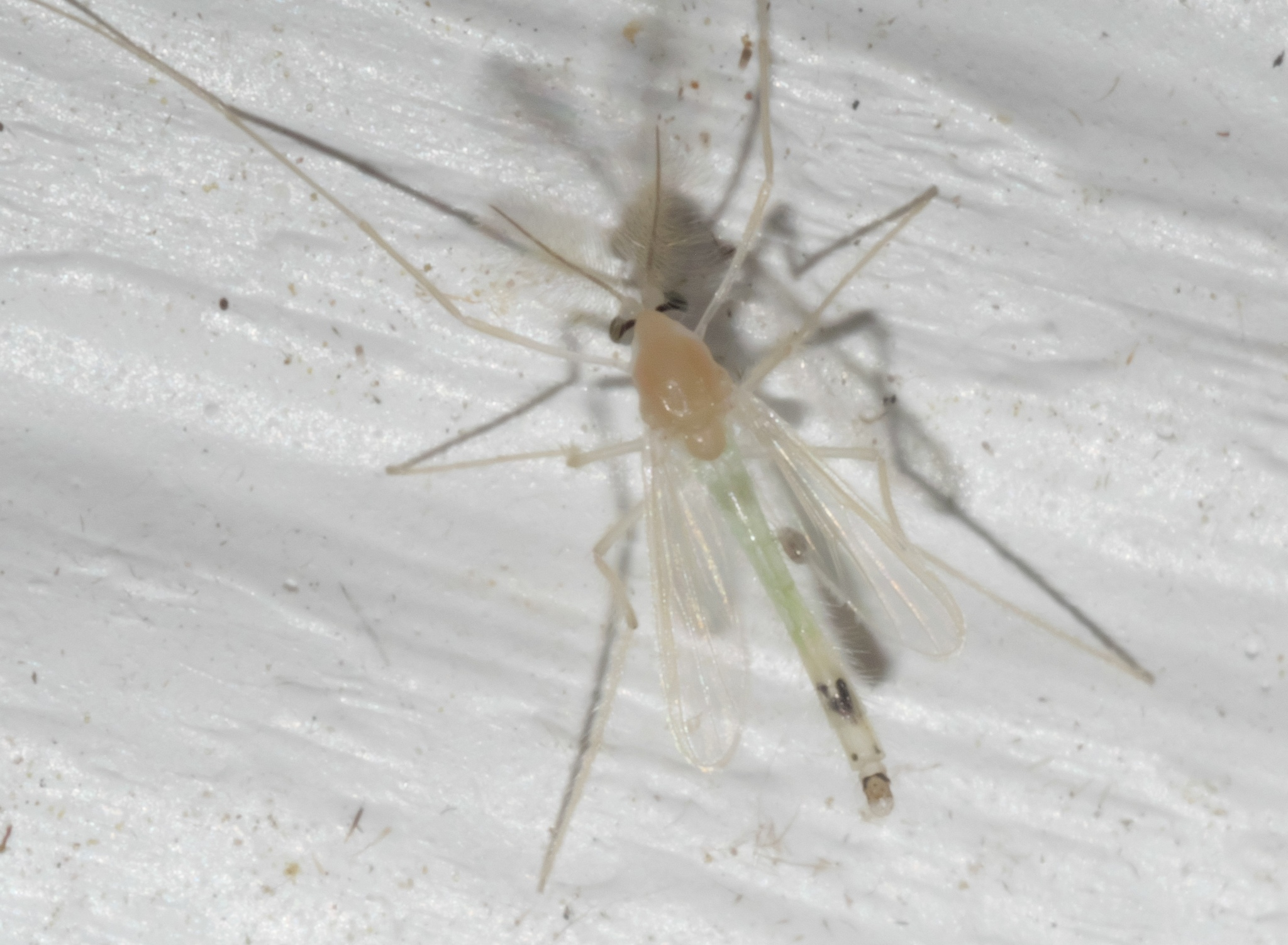
Stenochironomus macateei, Oklahoma

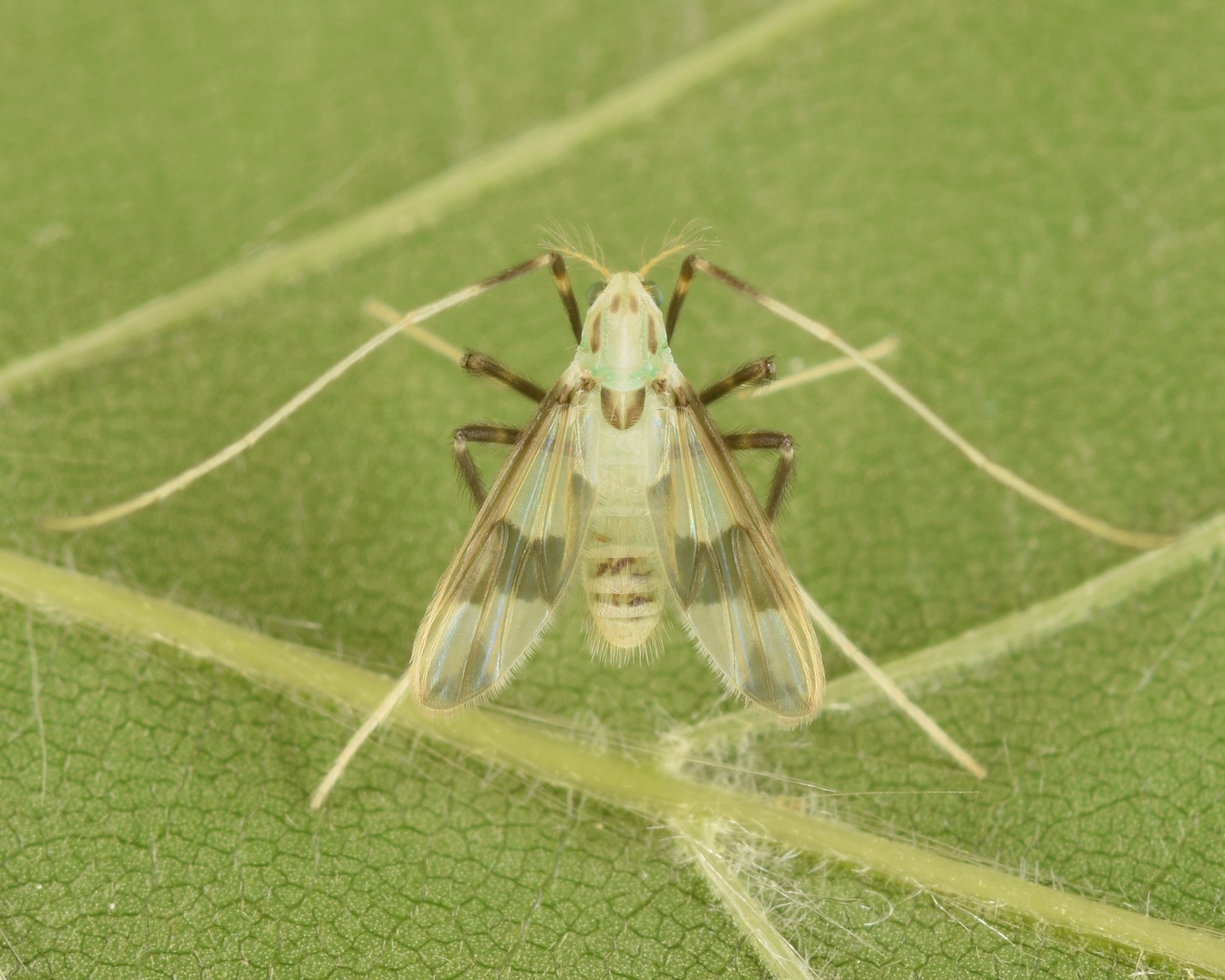
Stenochironomus poecilopterus, Georgia

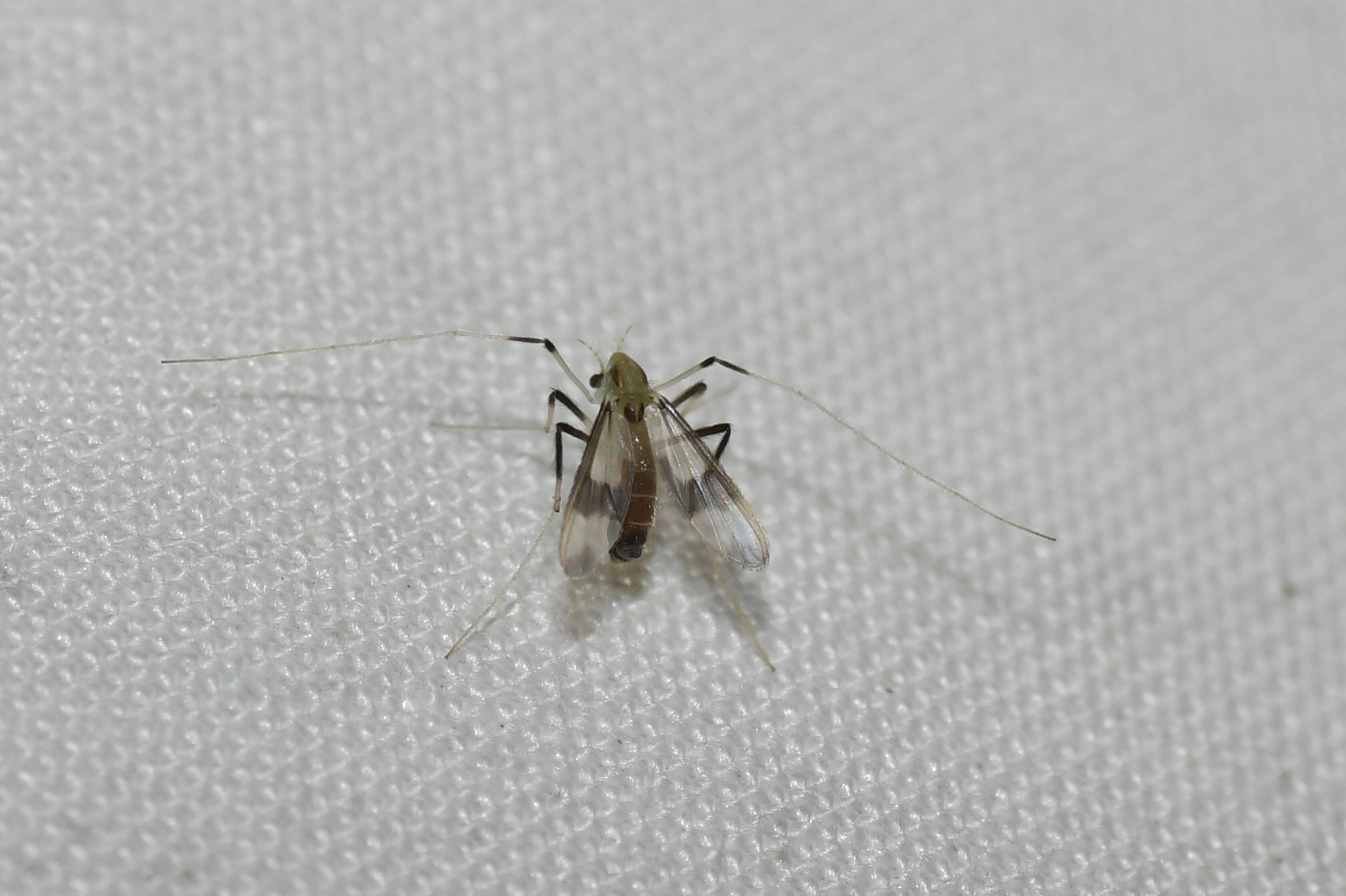
Stenochironomus pulchripennis, Canada

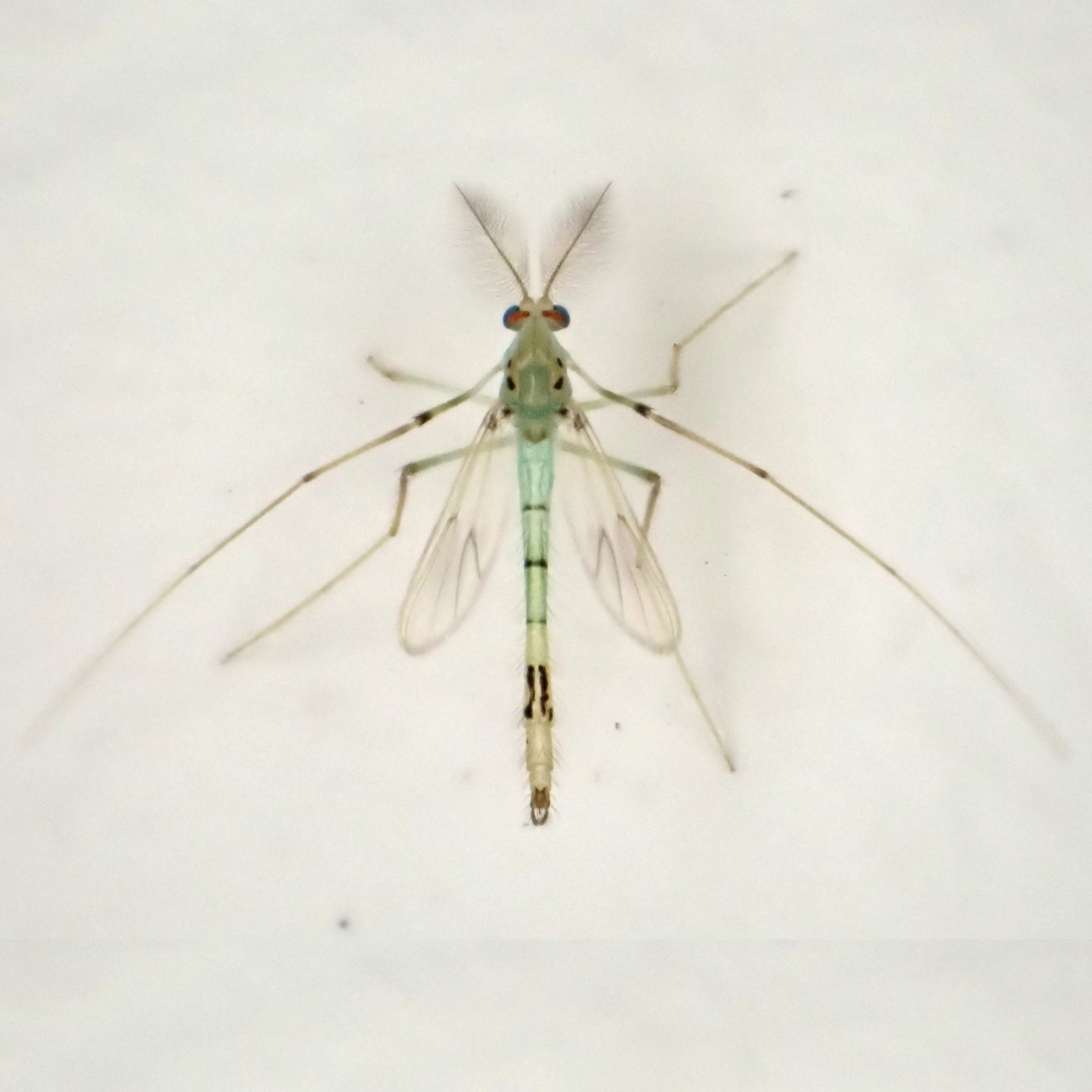
Stenochironomus quadrinotatus, Bolivia

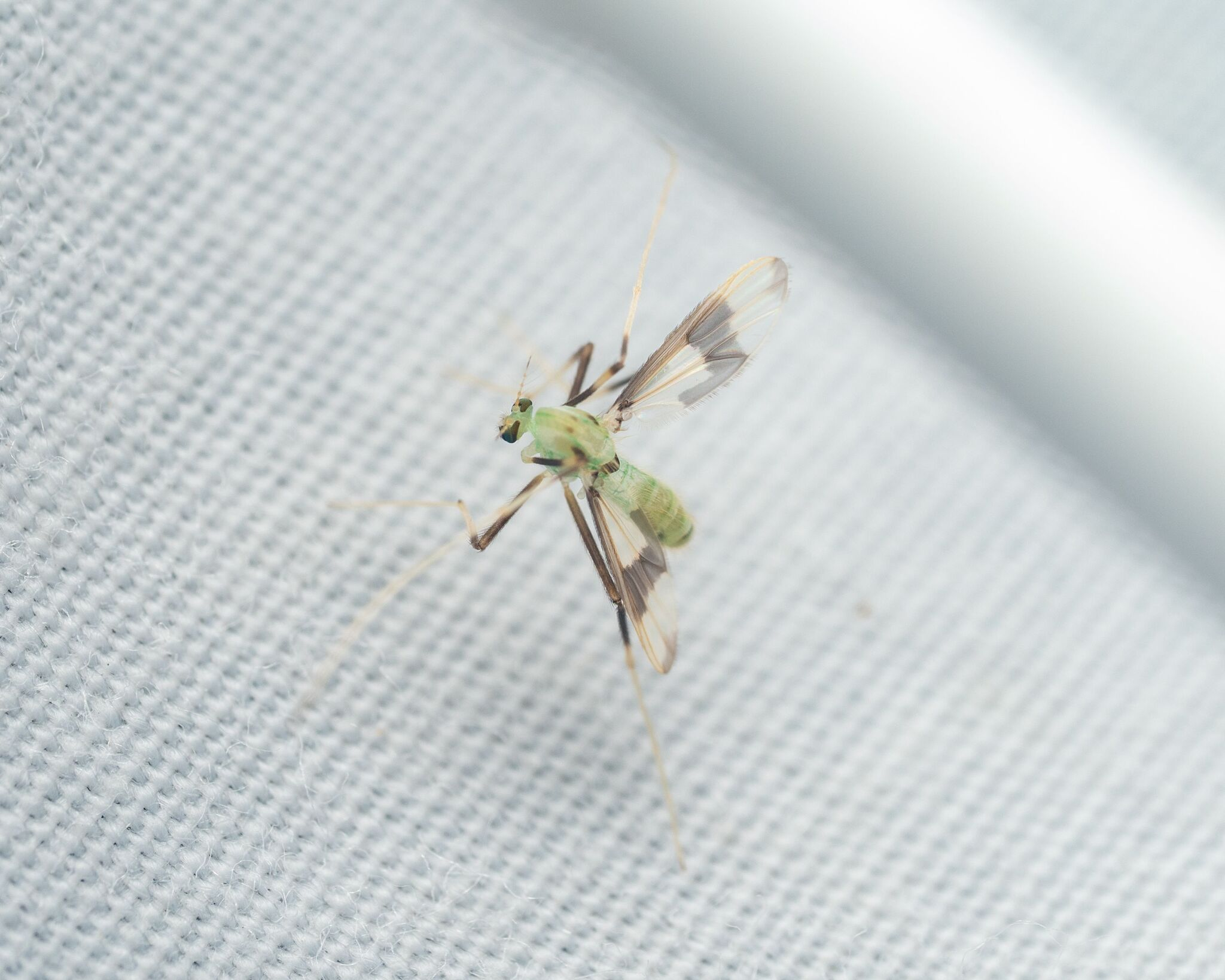
Stenochironomus woodi, North Carolina

Stenochironomus is a genus of non-biting midges in the family Chironomidae. There are more than 110 described species in Stenochironomus.

== Species ==
These 113 species belong to the genus Stenochironomus:

- Stenochironomus aculeatus Borkent, 1984
- Stenochironomus aestivalis Townes, 1945
- Stenochironomus africus Lehmann, 1981
- Stenochironomus albicoxa Freeman, 1957
- Stenochironomus albidorsalis Borkent, 1984
- Stenochironomus albipalpus Borkent, 1984
- Stenochironomus amazonicus Dantas, Hamada & Mendes, 2016
- Stenochironomus ancudensis (Edwards, 1931)
- Stenochironomus annettae Borkent, 1984
- Stenochironomus annulus Song & Qi, 2022
- Stenochironomus antennalis Kieffer, 1922
- Stenochironomus atlanticus Pinho & Mendes, 2005
- Stenochironomus atroconus Freeman, 1955
- Stenochironomus bacrionis Borkent, 1984
- Stenochironomus baizhanzuensis Song & Qi, 2022
- Stenochironomus balteatus Borkent, 1984
- Stenochironomus bare Dantas, Hamada & Mendes, 2016
- Stenochironomus bipunctatus Kieffer, 1922
- Stenochironomus bisetosus Borkent, 1984
- Stenochironomus bitensis Kieffer, 1924
- Stenochironomus borkentii Zorina, 2010
- Stenochironomus brevissimus Qi, Lin, Liu & Wang, 2015
- Stenochironomus browni Townes, 1945
- Stenochironomus cinctus Townes, 1945
- Stenochironomus colei (Malloch, 1919)
- Stenochironomus crusanticus Borkent, 1984
- Stenochironomus discus Borkent, 1984
- Stenochironomus edwardsi Freeman, 1957
- Stenochironomus emilianoi Sousa, Dantas, Hamada & Nascimento, 2025
- Stenochironomus falcifer Parise & Pinho, 2016
- Stenochironomus fascipennis (Zetterstedt, 1838)
- Stenochironomus figueiredoensis Dantas, Hamada & Mendes, 2016
- Stenochironomus fittkaui Borkent, 1984
- Stenochironomus fuscipatellus Borkent, 1984
- Stenochironomus gibba (Fabricius, 1794)
- Stenochironomus gladius Borkent, 1984
- Stenochironomus gotoabeus Sasa & Suzuki, 2000
- Stenochironomus gracilis Dantas, Hamada & Mendes, 2016
- Stenochironomus gracilivalva (Kieffer, 1917)
- Stenochironomus hainanus Qi, Shi & Wang, 2008
- Stenochironomus hallei Moubayed, 2024
- Stenochironomus harrisoni Freeman, 1957
- Stenochironomus hastatus Zorina, 2001
- Stenochironomus hibarasextus Sasa, 1993
- Stenochironomus hibernicus (Edwards, 1929)
- Stenochironomus hilaris (Walker, 1848)
- Stenochironomus ikiabeus Sasa & Suzuki, 1999
- Stenochironomus impendens Borkent, 1984
- Stenochironomus inalemus Sasa, Kitami & Suzuki, 2001
- Stenochironomus innocuus (Williston, 1896)
- Stenochironomus inpa Sousa, Dantas, Hamada & Nascimento, 2025
- Stenochironomus irioijeus Sasa & Suzuki, 2000
- Stenochironomus jubatus Borkent, 1984
- Stenochironomus koreanus Borkent, 1984
- Stenochironomus leptopus (Kieffer, 1906)
- Stenochironomus lianensis Qi, Lin, Liu & Wang, 2015
- Stenochironomus licinus Borkent, 1984
- Stenochironomus liviae Dantas, Hamada & Mendes, 2016
- Stenochironomus longilobatus (Tokunaga, 1964)
- Stenochironomus longipalpis (Kieffer, 1913)
- Stenochironomus macateei (Malloch, 1915)
- Stenochironomus maculatus Borkent, 1984
- Stenochironomus maikeae Andersen, Mendes & Pinho, 2008
- Stenochironomus manauara Dantas, Hamada & Mendes, 2016
- Stenochironomus membranifer Yamamoto, 1981
- Stenochironomus messias
- Stenochironomus micronyx Goetghebuer, 1936
- Stenochironomus mucronatus Qi, Shi & Wang, 2008
- Stenochironomus munteanpurin Amora, Hamada & Pinho, 2018
- Stenochironomus nelumbus (Tokunaga, 1935)
- Stenochironomus niger Borkent, 1984
- Stenochironomus nubilipennis Yamamoto, 1981
- Stenochironomus nudipupa Borkent, 1984
- Stenochironomus occultus Kieffer, 1924
- Stenochironomus okialbus Sasa, 1990
- Stenochironomus oliveirai
- Stenochironomus oyabearcuatus Sasa, Kawai & Ueno, 1988
- Stenochironomus palliaculeatus Borkent, 1984
- Stenochironomus pannus Borkent, 1984
- Stenochironomus paraokialbus Song & Qi, 2025
- Stenochironomus pectinatus Borkent, 1984
- Stenochironomus poecilopterus (Mitchell, 1908)
- Stenochironomus polychaetus Kieffer, 1922
- Stenochironomus prolatus Borkent, 1984
- Stenochironomus pulchripennis (Coquillett, 1902)
- Stenochironomus pustulatus Freeman, 1955
- Stenochironomus quadrinotatus Borkent, 1984
- Stenochironomus ranzii Rossaro, 1982
- Stenochironomus recticaudatus Borkent, 1984
- Stenochironomus reissi Borkent, 1984
- Stenochironomus roquei Dantas, Hamada & Mendes, 2010
- Stenochironomus sabroskyi Tokunaga, 1964
- Stenochironomus satorui (Tokunaga & Kuroda, 1936)
- Stenochironomus sebastiao Andersen, Mendes & Pinho, 2008
- Stenochironomus semifumosus (Edwards, 1931)
- Stenochironomus shoubimaculatus Sasa, 1989
- Stenochironomus sibaefeus Sasa, Sumita & Suzuki, 1999
- Stenochironomus spatuliger Kieffer, 1922
- Stenochironomus suzanae Dantas, Hamada & Mendes, 2016
- Stenochironomus takahashii (Tokunaga, 1938)
- Stenochironomus tobaduodecimus Kikuchi & Sasa, 1990
- Stenochironomus totifuscus Sublette, 1960
- Stenochironomus townesi Borkent, 1984
- Stenochironomus triannulatus Borkent, 1984
- Stenochironomus unicalcar Freeman, 1961
- Stenochironomus unictus Townes, 1945
- Stenochironomus varius Borkent, 1984
- Stenochironomus vatius Borkent, 1984
- Stenochironomus watsoni Freeman, 1961
- Stenochironomus woodi Borkent, 1984
- Stenochironomus xianjuensis Zhang, Gu, Qi & Wang, 2016
- Stenochironomus zhengi Lin & Liu, 2021
- Stenochironomus zonarius Borkent, 1984
