= Stenochironomus woodi =

Scientific classification
- Domain: Eukaryota
- Kingdom: Animalia
- Phylum: Arthropoda
- Class: Insecta
- Order: Diptera
- Family: Chironomidae
- Tribe: Chironomini
- Genus: Stenochironomus
- Species: S. woodi

Binomial name
- Stenochironomus woodi Borkent, 1984

Species of fly

Stenochironomus woodi is a species of midge in the family Chironomidae.
