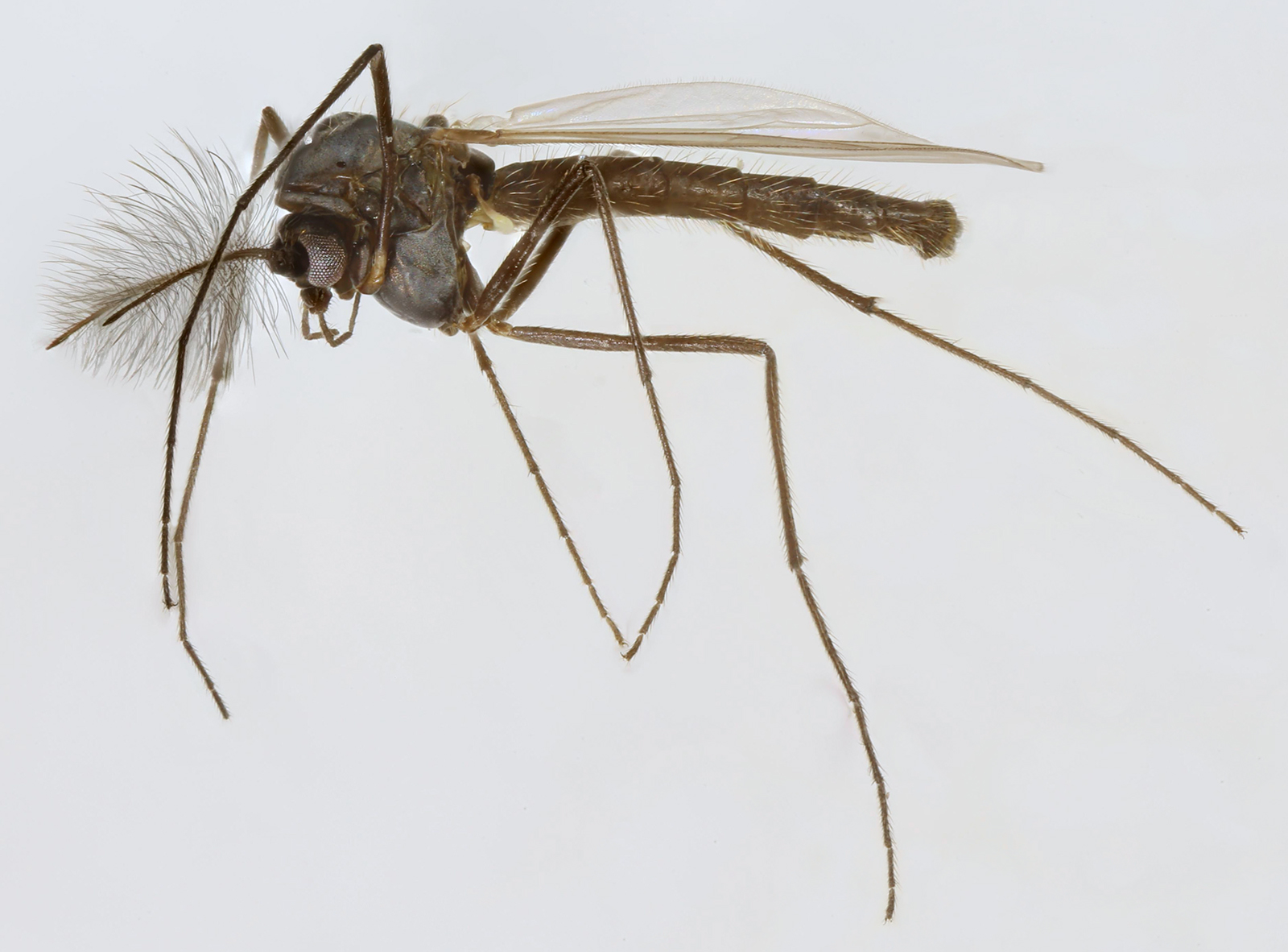
- Chaetocladius suecicus North Wales

Scientific classification
- Domain: Eukaryota
- Kingdom: Animalia
- Phylum: Arthropoda
- Class: Insecta
- Order: Diptera
- Family: Chironomidae
- Genus: Chaetocladius
- Species: C. suecicus

Binomial name
- Chaetocladius suecicus Kieffer, 1916

= Chaetocladius suecicus =

Species of fly

Chaetocladius suecicus is a species of fly in the family Chironomidae. It is found in the Palearctic.
