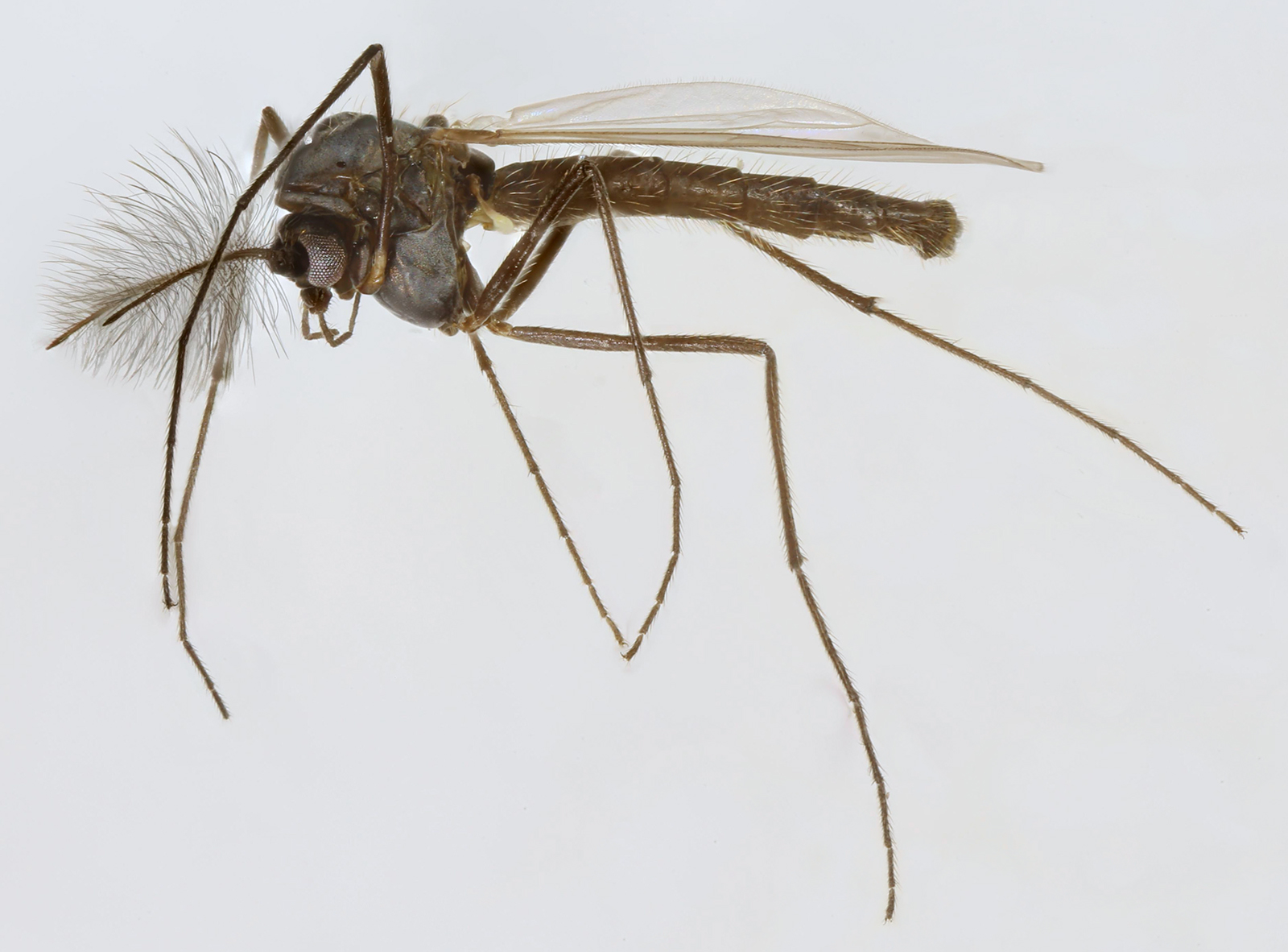
- Chaetocladius suecicus

Scientific classification
- Kingdom: Animalia
- Phylum: Arthropoda
- Clade: Pancrustacea
- Class: Insecta
- Order: Diptera
- Family: Chironomidae
- Subfamily: Orthocladiinae
- Genus: Chaetocladius; Kieffer, 1911

= Chaetocladius =

Genus of flies

Chaetocladius is a genus of non-biting midges in the subfamily Orthocladiinae of the bloodworm family (Chironomidae).

== Species ==
This is an incomplete list of the species in this genus:

- C. absolutus Wang, et al., 2012
- C. acuminatus Brundin 1956
- C. acuticornis (Kieffer 1914)
- C. aedeagolobatus Rossaro et al., 2017
- C. algericus Moubayed 1989
- C. amnunnycta Makarchenko & Makarchenko, 2011
- C. amurensis Makarchenko & Makarchenko, 2006
- C. antipovae Makarchenko & Makarchenko, 2011
- C. artistylus Bhattacharyay & Chaudhuri, 1993
- C. autumnalis Makarchenko & Makarchenko, 2004
- C. berythensis Moubayed & Langton, 2019
- C. bitusiki Moubayed-Breil, 2019
- C. binotatus (Lundström 1915)
- C. britae Säwedal 1976
- C. callauensis Moubayed & Langton, 2019
- C. castellae Moubayed-Breil & Lods-Crozet, 2018
- C. coppai Moubayed-Breil, 2017
- C. crassisaetosus Tuiskunen 1986
- C. curvatus Bhattacharyay & Chaudhuri, 1993
- C. dentiforceps (Edwards 1929)
- C. diai Moubayed-Breil, 2017
- C. dilatus Bhattacharyay & Chaudhuri, 1993
- C. dissipatus (Edwards 1929)
- C. egorych Makarchenko & Makarchenko, 2017
- C. elegans Makarchenko & Makarchenko, 2002
- C. elenae Makarchenko & Makarchenko, 2013
- C. elisabethae Makarchenko & Makarchenko, 2018
- C. fedotkin Makarchenko & Makarchenko, 2013
- C. franzjosephiensis (Krasheninnikov 2013)
- C. gelidus Brundin 1956
- C. glacialis (Lundström 1915)
- C. gracilis Brundin 1956
- C. grandilobus Brundin 1956
- C. guardiolei Moubayed & Langton, 2019
- C. guisseti Moubayed-Breil, 2017
- C. holmgreni (Jacobson 1898)
- C. insolitus Caspers 1987
- C. insularis Makarchenko & Makarchenko, 2004
- C. ketoiensis Makarchenko & Makarchenko, 2004
- C. khrulevae Makarchenko & Makarchenko, 2013
- C. laminatus Brundin 1947
- C. lencioniae Moubayed-Breil & Lods-Crozet, 2018
- C. ligni Cranston et Oliver, 1988
- C. lodscrozetae Moubayed-Breil & Lods-Crozet, 2018
- C. longivirgatus Stur & Spies, 2011
- C. lopatinskiy Makarchenko & Makarchenko, 2017
- C. macunensis Moubayed-Breil & Lods-Crozet, 2018
- C. maeaeri Brundin 1947
- C. magnalobus Makarchenko & Makarchenko, 2009
- C. mantetensis Moubayed-Breil, 2019
- C. melaleucus (Meigen, 1818)
- C. minutissimus Goetghebuer 1942
- C. muliebris Tuiskunen 1986
- C. muttensis Moubayed-Breil & Lods-Crozet, 2018
- C. nudisquamus Makarchenko & Makarchenko, 2003
- C. orientalis Chaudhuri & Ghosh, 1982
- C. oyabevenustus Sasa et al., 1988
- C. parerai Moubayed & Langton, 2019
- C. perennis (Meigen, 1830)
- C. piger (Goetghebuer 1913)
- C. pseudoligni Makarchenko & Makarchenko, 2002
- C. rottensis Lods-Crozet & Moubayed, 2024
- C. rusticus (Goetghebuer 1932)
- C. spiridonovi Krasheninnikov et al., 2022
- C. subalpinus Rossaro et al., 2017
- C. subplumosus (Kieffer 1923)
- C. suecicus (Kieffer 1916)
- C. tenuiflexus Bhattacharyay & Chaudhuri, 1993
- C. tenuistylus Brundin 1947
- C. tibetensis Wang, et al., 2012
- C. ticinoi Rossaro et al., 2017
- C. triquetrus Wang, et al., 2012
- C. unicus Makarchenko & Makarchenko, 2002
- C. valdostanus Rossaro, 2017
- C. variabilis Makarchenko & Makarchenko, 2003
- C. vitellinus (Kieffer 1908)
- C. yavorskayae Makarchenko & Makarchenko, 2017
