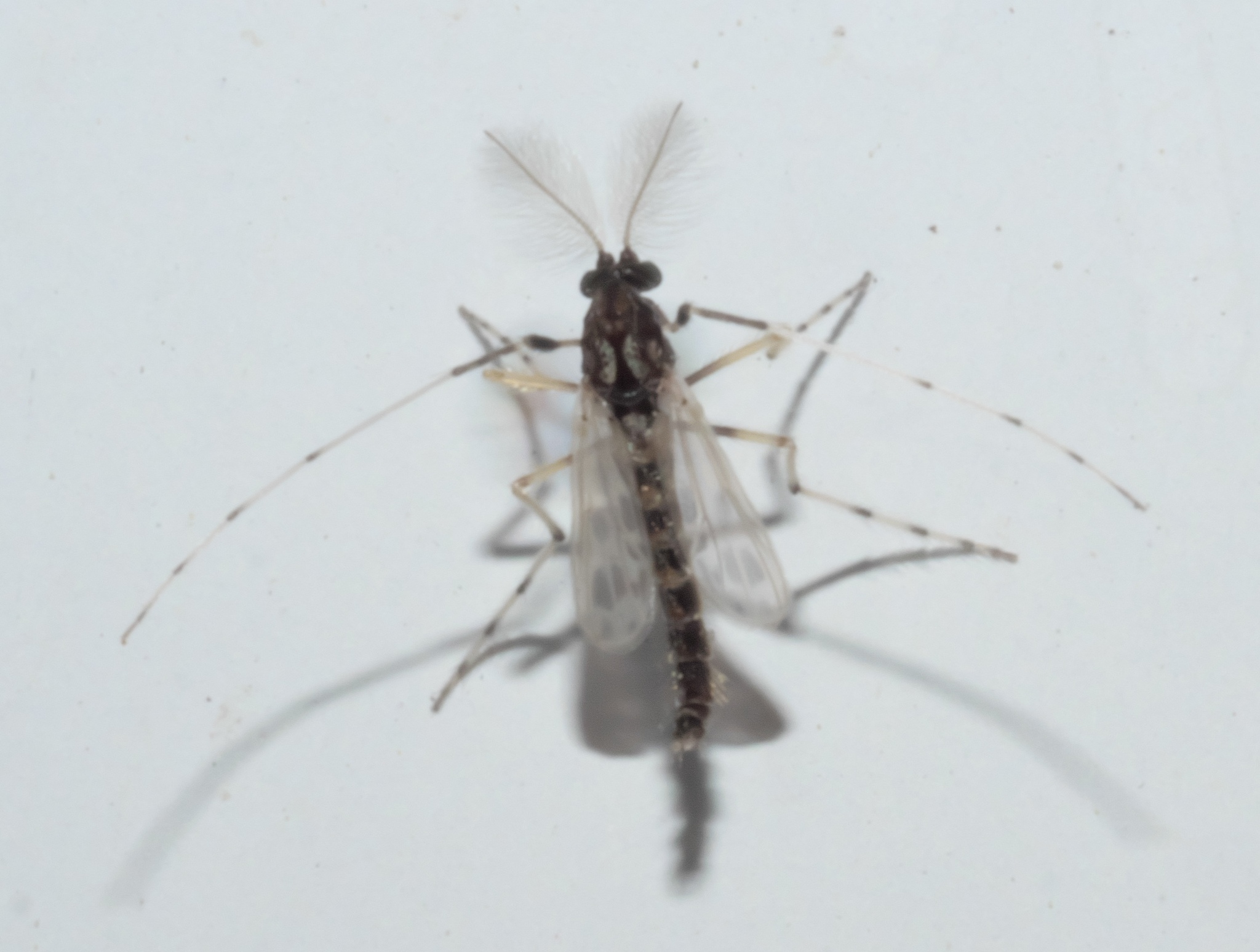
- Zavreliella marmorata, male, Oklahoma

Scientific classification
- Domain: Eukaryota
- Kingdom: Animalia
- Phylum: Arthropoda
- Class: Insecta
- Order: Diptera
- Family: Chironomidae
- Tribe: Chironomini
- Genus: Zavreliella
- Species: Z. marmorata

Binomial name
- Zavreliella marmorata (Wulp, 1858)

= Zavreliella marmorata =

Species of fly

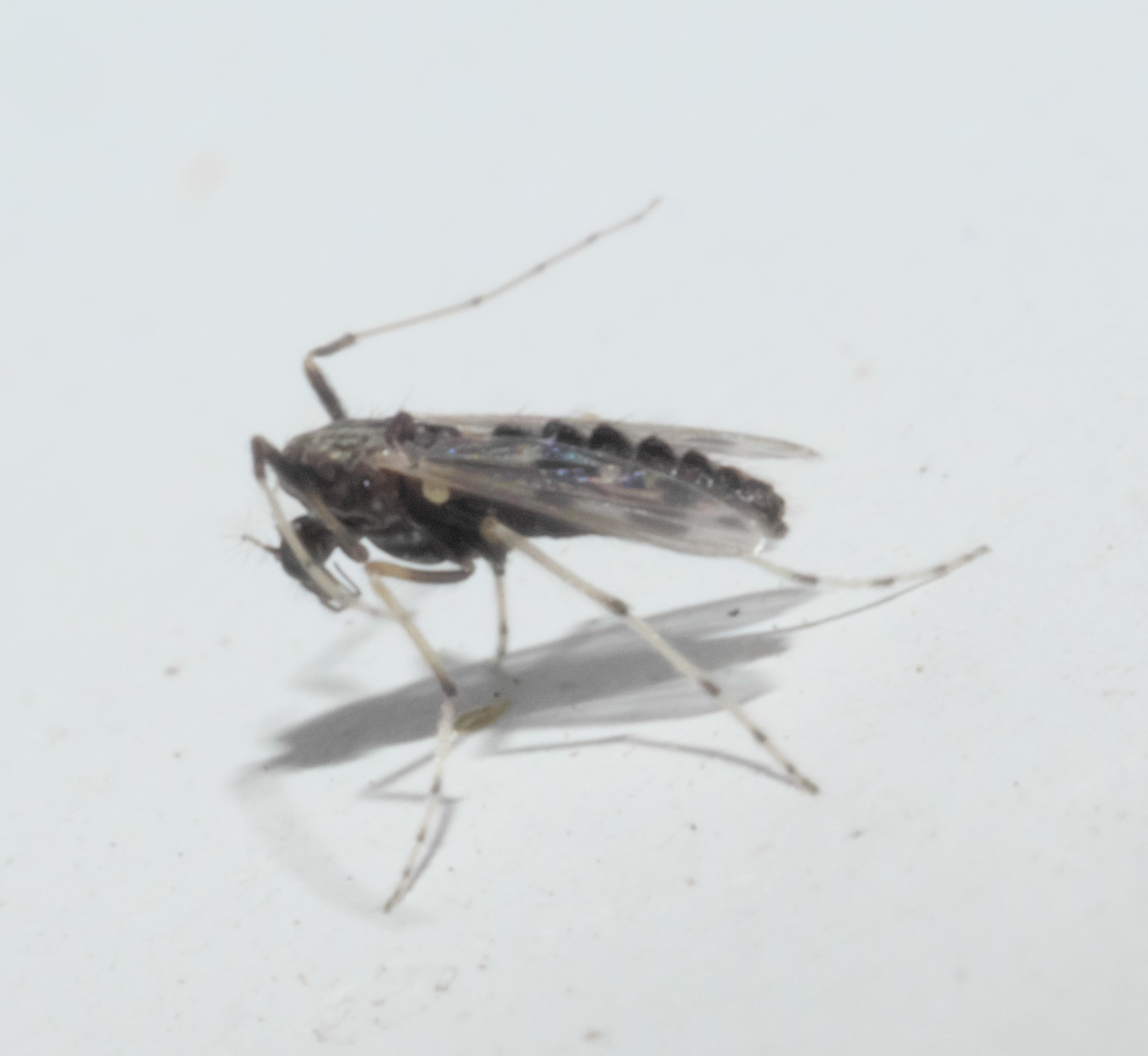
Zavreliella marmorata, female, Oklahoma

Zavreliella marmorata is a species of midge in the family Chironomidae. It is found throughout much of the world, especially in Europe and North America.

The adults are around 3 mm in length.
