= Diplocladius =

Scientific classification
- Kingdom: Animalia
- Phylum: Arthropoda
- Clade: Pancrustacea
- Class: Insecta
- Order: Diptera
- Family: Chironomidae
- Subfamily: Orthocladiinae
- Genus: Diplocladius; Kieffer, 1908

Genus of flies

Diplocladius is a genus of non-biting midges in the subfamily Orthocladiinae of the bloodworm family Chironomidae.

== Species ==
- D. calonotus (Edwards, 1931)
- D. cultriger Kieffer in Kieffer & Thienemann, 1908 (Synonym - D. bilobatus Brundin, 1956)
- D. flavozonatus (Edwards, 1931)
- D. pulchripennis (Edwards, 1931)
