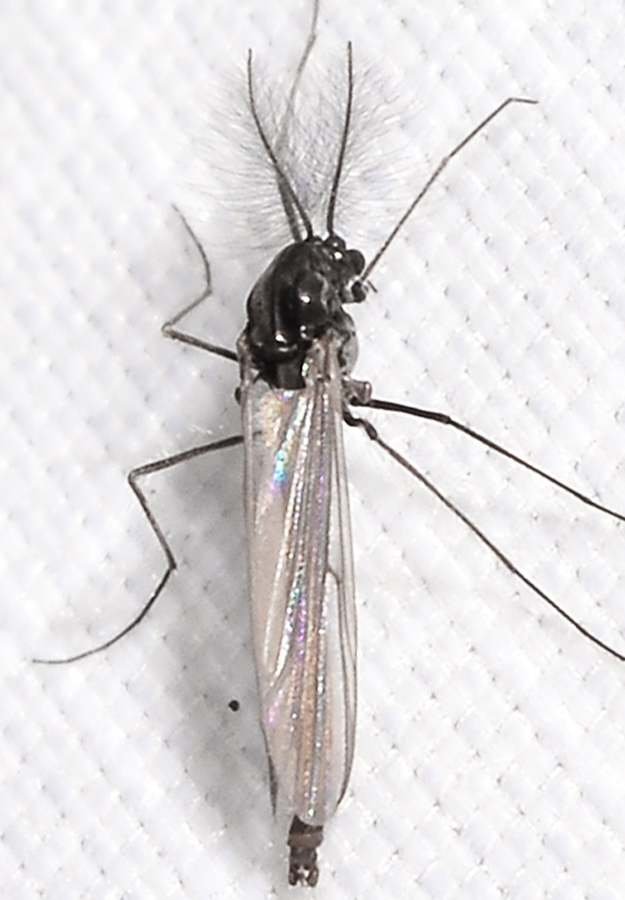

Scientific classification
- Domain: Eukaryota
- Kingdom: Animalia
- Phylum: Arthropoda
- Class: Insecta
- Order: Diptera
- Family: Chironomidae
- Genus: Diplocladius
- Species: D. cultriger

Binomial name
- Diplocladius cultriger Kieffer, 1908

Synonyms
- Diplocladius bilobatus Brundin, 1956

= Diplocladius cultriger =

Species of fly

Diplocladius cultriger is a species of midge in the family Chironomidae. It is found in Europe.
