= Cytogenetic notation =

Symbols and abbreviations used in cytogenetics

The following table summarizes symbols and abbreviations used in cytogenetics. Band numbers describe positions along a chromosome arm from the centromere outward; for example, 11p15.4 denotes band 15.4 on the short arm of chromosome 11.

Symbol	Description
< >	Ploidy level (e.g. 23<1n> is haploid; in the sense of # of complete sets)
[ ]	Number of cells in a cell line/clone, # of metaphases examined (suffix)
,	Separates modal number (total number of chromosomes), sex chromosomes, and chromosome abnormalities
-	Loss of a chromosome / a set of bands / decrease in length
( )	Grouping for breakpoints and structurally altered chromosomes
+	Gain of a chromosome / a set of bands / increase in length
;	Separates rearranged chromosomes and breakpoints involving more than one chromosome
/	Separates cell lines, clones, or contiguous probes
//	Separates recipient and donor cell lines in bone marrow transplants
~	Indicates a region of uncertainty
add	terminal additional material of unknown origin
del	Deletion
der	Derivative chromosome, structure rearrangement that is de novo or inherited by meiotic malsegregation of a parental balanced rearrangement.
dic	Dicentric chromosome
dim	diminished signal intensity
dn	de novo (not inherited) chromosomal abnormality
dup	Duplication of a portion of a chromosome
enh	enhanced signal intensity
fra	Fragile site (usually used with fragile X syndrome)
h	Heterochromatic region of chromosome
i	Isochromosome
idic	Isodicentric chromosome (duplication & inversion of centromere-containing segment)
ins	Insertion
inv	Inversion
ish	Precedes karyotype results from FISH analysis
nuc	Nuclear, interphase
mar	Marker chromosome
mat	Maternally-derived chromosome rearrangement
p	Short arm of a chromosome
pat	Paternally-derived chromosome rearrangement
psu dic	pseudo dicentric – only one centromere in a dicentric chromosome is active
q	Long arm of a chromosome
r	Ring chromosome
rec	Recombimant chromosome. Structural rearrangement with a new segmental composition due to meiotic crossing over (e.g. insersion, inversion) of a parental balanced rearrangement
t	Translocation
ter	Terminal end of arm (e.g. 2qter refers to the end of the long arm of chromosome 2)
tri	Trisomy
trp	Triplication of a portion of a chromosome

In human genetics, the symbols are defined in the International System for Human Cytogenetic Nomenclature (ISCN). (The 2024 version of ICSN is accessible free-of-charge.)

The ISCN define two broad groups of formats:[4]: §4.7 

- Karyotype format, the more traditional option where locations are described at the level of arms and bands (cytogenic coordinates).
- Microarray format, which is originally designed for copy number change detected by a microarray using the × (times) symbol and works with genomic coordinates (numeric positions according to a certain reference genome assembly) where the start and end for each region are connected by an underscore (_).

There are three levels of detail that can be used in each format:

- Abbreviated system, which only looks at the level of whole chromosomes without describing any breakpoints.
- Short system, which includes the location of breakpoints in abnormalities using the two system's respective preferred means.
- Detailed/extended system, which eliminates possible ambiguities in the description of breakpoints by:
  - For karyotype format, der (derived chromosomes) are described by listing what bands it has from pter (end of short arm) to qter (end of long arm). e terminals may be prefixed with a number if the terminal part of a different chromosome is involved.
  - For microarray format, not only are parts that show copy number abormality shown, but also the location for neighboring normal parts.

Cytogenic results may be prefixed by an abbreviation of the method used, such as ish (FISH), nuc ish (interphase FISH), arr (microarray), seq (sequencing), and ogm (optical genome mapping). Results from two ish methods can optionally add a parenthetical indicating the signal pattern using the multiplication symbol. Results from seq and ogm include specific nucleotide coordinates even in karyotype format. The ISCN documentation also describes the alternative Human Genome Variation Society (HGVS) format.

== See also ==
- Chromosome abnormalities
- Directionality (molecular biology) for 3' and 5' notation
- locus (genetics) for basic notational system
