= Chromosomal inversion =

Chromosome rearrangement in which a segment of a chromosome is reversed

An inversion is a chromosome rearrangement in which a segment of a chromosome becomes inverted within its original position. An inversion occurs when a chromosome undergoes two breaks within the same chromosomal arm, and the segment between the two breaks inserts itself in the opposite direction in the same chromosome arm. The breakpoints of inversions often happen in regions of repetitive nucleotides, and the regions may be reused in other inversions. Chromosomal segments in inversions can be as small as 1 kilobase or as large as 100 megabases. The number of genes captured by an inversion can range from a handful of genes to hundreds of genes. Inversions can happen either through ectopic recombination between repetitive sequences, or through chromosomal breakage followed by non-homologous end joining.

Inversions are of two types: paracentric and pericentric. Paracentric inversions do not include the centromere, and both breakpoints occur in one arm of the chromosome. Pericentric inversions span the centromere, and there is a breakpoint in each arm.

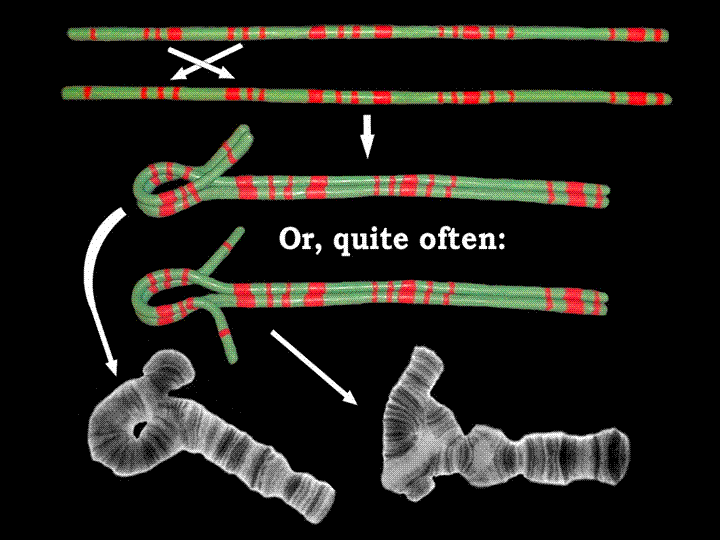
A clay model showing why heterozygous inversion loops are visible in polytene chromosome preparations

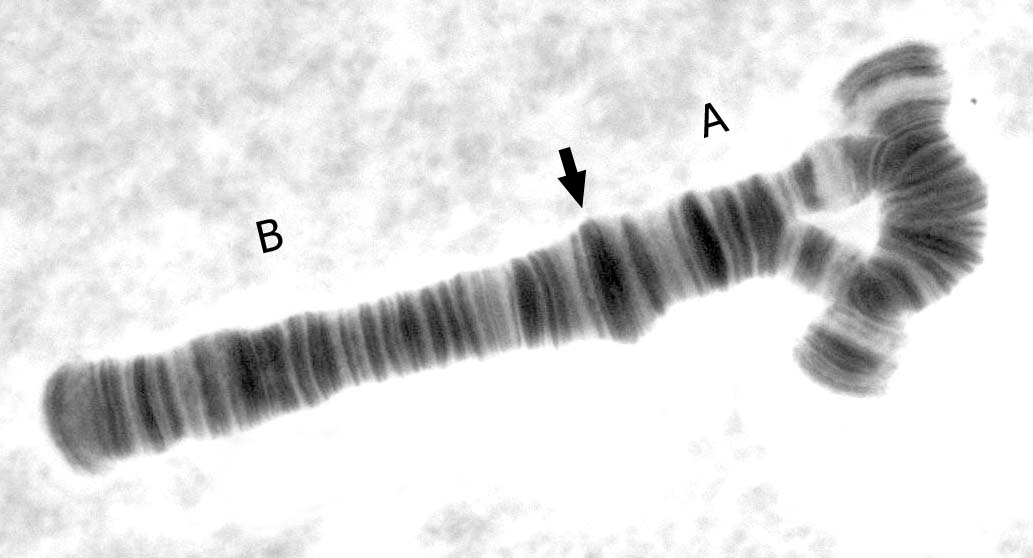
An inversion loop in the A arm of a chromosome from an Axarus species midge

Inversions usually do not cause any abnormalities in carriers, as long as the rearrangement is balanced, with no extra or missing DNA. However, in individuals which are heterozygous for an inversion, there is an increased production of abnormal chromatids (this occurs when crossing-over occurs within the span of the inversion). This leads to lowered fertility, due to production of unbalanced gametes. Inversions do not involve either loss or gain of genetic information; they simply rearrange the linear DNA sequence.

== Detection ==
Cytogenetic techniques may be able to detect inversions, or inversions may be inferred from genetic analysis. Some of the techniques that are used to detect inversions are: Karyotype Analysis, G banding, Fluorescence in situ hybridization. Nevertheless, in most species, small inversions go undetected. More recently, comparative genomics has been used to detect chromosomal inversions, by mapping the genome. Population genomics may also be used to detect inversions, using areas of high linkage disequilibrium as indicators for possible inversion sites. Linkage disequilibrium refers to the non-random association of alleles at different genetic loci. When alleles combinations occur more frequently than expected under random assortment, the loci are said to be in linkage disequilibrium. In regions containing chromosomal inversions, suppressed recombination can result in linkage disequilibrium. Human families that may be carriers of inversions may be offered genetic counseling and genetic testing.

== History ==
The first evidence of a chromosomal inversion was found in 1921 by Alfred Sturtevant in Drosophila melanogaster. Since then, inversions have been found in all eukaryotes. When discovered by Sturtevant, inversions were regarded as areas of recombination suppression.

Originally, these inversions were noted in polytene chromosomes within the salivary glands of heterozygous Drosophila melanogaster larvae. In 1970, Theodosius Dobzhansky noted that genes within an inversion had higher fitness than those that are found outside of the inversions, although this is an area that needs further study.

One of the more recent models of inversions is the Kirkpatrick and Barton Model (2006), which states that inversions are selectively advantageous by linking together adaptive alleles. By physically linking co-adapted variants at multiple genes into distinct versions (haplotypes) of an inversion, selection should be more efficient in driving these variants to high frequency in a population. This is in contrast to non-inverted regions, which may allow adaptive and maladaptive alleles to be carried.

== Effects on recombination ==
When an inversion carrying chromosome is paired with a non-inverted homologous chromosome (Inversion heterozygotes) during meiosis, they fail to synapse properly and inversion loops are formed. A crossing-over within the loop can produce unbalanced gametes. In a paracentric inversion, recombination results in one dicentric chromatid and one acentric chromatid. During Anaphase, both recombinants are faced with problems. The acentric chromatid is pulled to one pole or the other, and the dicentric recombinant generates dicentric bridges as it is pulled in two directions.

In a pericentric inversion, similar imbalanced chromosomes are produced. The recombinant chromosomes resulting from these crosses include deletions and duplications. The offspring produced by such gametes are mostly inviable, and therefore, recombination is indirectly suppressed within inverted regions.

== Evolutionary consequences ==
The suppressed recombination between inversion heterozygotes provides an opportunity for the independent evolution of the ancestral and inverted arrangements. At the beginning, the inverted arrangement lacks variation, while the ancestral one does not. If the inverted haplotype is not lost (e.g. due to drift), the variation in the inverted arrangement can increase over time, and recombination rate in the inverted region is somewhat restored as more homozygotes are introduced.

Chromosomal inversions have gained a lot of attention in evolutionary research due to their potential role in local adaptation and speciation. Because non-recombining inversion haplotypes may harbor multiple co-adapted gene variants, inversions are thought to facilitate local adaptation to different environments because natural selection is more efficient in driving such linked adaptive variants to high frequency within a population. However, empirically demonstrating the presence of linked, co-adapted gene variants within inversions is difficult because inversion haplotypes do not recombine. Moreover, this possible positive effect of chromosomal inversions for adaptation to different environments rests on the assumption that adaptive gene variants linked into distinct inversion haplotypes are indeed co-adapted. This idea is, however, likely violated in situations where populations experience spatially or temporally varying selection. Because of fluctuating selection on inversion-linked variants, the absence of recombination between inversion haplotypes harboring distinct gene variants may then constrain rather than help adaptation to distinct environments. The importance of chromosomal inversions in adaptation to different environments therefore remains an open empirical problem in evolutionary genetics.

Inversion polymorphism can be established in two ways. Genetic drift or selection can result in fixation of an inversion in a local population. Inversion polymorphism can result from gene flow between this population and a population without the inversion. Balancing selection can also result in inversion polymorphism by frequency dependence or overdominance. The fitness differences between the inverted and the ancestral chromosome can either produce a stable polymorphism or can result in the fixation of one or the other chromosome.

Inversions have been essential to sex chromosome evolution. In mammals, the Y chromosome is unable to recombine with the X chromosome, almost along its entire length. This non-recombining portion results from a series of inversions that overlap. Decreased recombination rate between sex determining loci and sex-anatagonistic genes is favored by selection. This causes linkage disequilibrium between the male determining locus and an allele at another locus that is beneficial to males. This can happen through inversions resulting in a non-recombining block including both loci, as is the case in the mammalian Y chromosome.

Inversions can also be essential in the origination of new sex chromosomes. They can cause linkage disequilibrium between a sex-determining mutation and sex-antagonistic loci and create a new sex chromosome from an autosome.

Inversions can be involved in speciation in multiple ways. Since heterozygote inversions can be underdominant, they can cause hybrid fitness loss, resulting in post-zygotic isolation. They can also accumulate selected differences between species, causing both pre- and post-zygotic isolation.

Inversions often form geographical clines in frequency which can hint to their role in local adaptation. A prominent instance of such a cline is inversion 3RP in Drosophila melanogaster that can be observed in three different continents. When an inversion contains two or more locally adaptive alleles, it can be selected and spread. For example; in the butterfly Heliconius numata, 18 genes controlling colors are linked together by inversions as together they confer higher fitness.

== Nomenclature ==
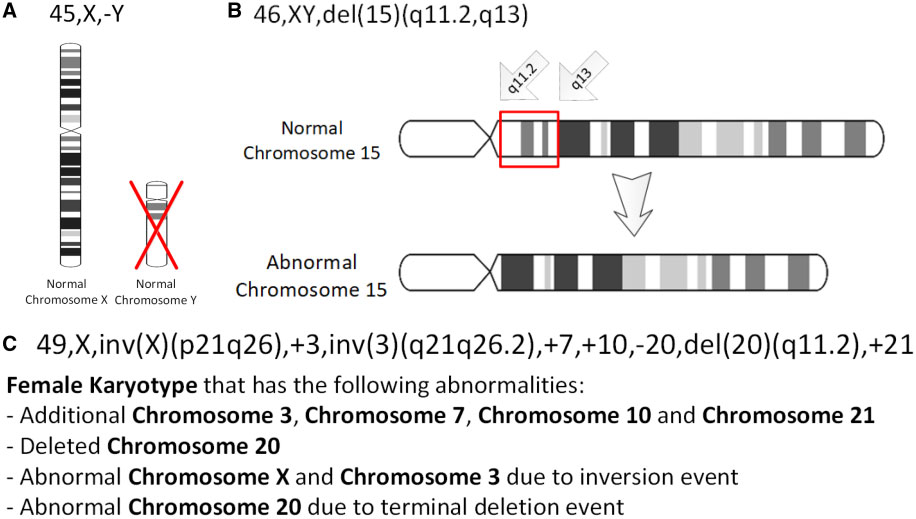
Three chromosomal abnormalities with ISCN nomenclature, with increasing complexity: (A) A tumour karyotype in a male with loss of the Y chromosome, (B) Prader–Willi Syndrome i.e. deletion in the 15q11-q12 region and (C) an arbitrary karyotype that involves a variety of autosomal and allosomal abnormalities including inversions (abbreviated as inv).

Human karyotype with annotated bands and sub-bands as used for the nomenclature of chromosome abnormalities. It shows dark and white regions as seen on G banding. Each row is vertically aligned at centromere level. It shows 22 homologous autosomal chromosome pairs as well as both the female (XX) and male (XY) versions of the two sex chromosomes.

The International System for Human Cytogenomic Nomenclature (ISCN) is an international standard for human chromosome nomenclature, which includes band names, symbols, and abbreviated terms used in the description of human chromosome and chromosome abnormalities. Abbreviations include inv for inversions.

== Notable cases ==
- Brenden Adams: former holder of the Guinness World Record for tallest teenager. His height is caused by an inversion of chromosome 12.
- An example of chromosomal inversion in organisms is demonstrated in the insect Coelopa frigida. This particular species of Coelopa has a variation of chromosomal inversions that allow the species to create a series of physical differences. Individual C. frigida that are larger do not undergo a chromosomal inversion, whereas individuals that are smaller do undergo a chromosomal inversion.
