= Derivative chromosome =

Human karyotype with annotated bands and sub-bands as used for the nomenclature of chromosome abnormalities. It shows 22 homologous autosomal chromosome pairs, both the female (XX) and male (XY) versions of the two sex chromosomes, as well as the mitochondrial genome (at bottom left).

A derivative chromosome (der) is a structurally rearranged chromosome generated either by a chromosome rearrangement involving two or more chromosomes or by multiple chromosome aberrations within a single chromosome (e.g. an inversion and a deletion of the same chromosome, or deletions in both arms of a single chromosome). The term always refers to the chromosome that has an intact centromere. Derivative chromosomes are designated by the abbreviation der when used to describe a Karyotype. The derivative chromosome must be specified in parentheses followed by all aberrations involved in this derivative chromosome. The aberrations must be listed from pter to qter and not be separated by a comma.

For example, 46,XY,der(4)t(4;8)(p16;q22)t(4;9)(q31;q31) would refer to a derivative chromosome 4 which is the result of a translocation between the short arm of chromosome 4 at region 1, band 6 and the long arm of chromosome 8 at region 2, band 2, and a translocation between the long arm of chromosome 4 at region 3, band 1 and the long arm of chromosome 9 at region 3, band 1. As for the initial string "46,XY", it only signifies that this translocation is occurring in an organism, which has this set of chromosomes, i.e. a human being.
