= Chromosomal rearrangement =

Type of genetic mutation

Schematic karyogram, with annotated bands and sub-bands as used in the International System for Human Cytogenomic Nomenclature of chromosomal rearrangements. It shows 22 homologous autosomal chromosome pairs, both the female (XX) and male (XY) versions of the two sex chromosomes, as well as the mitochondrial genome (at bottom left).

In genetics, a chromosomal rearrangement is a mutation that is a type of chromosome abnormality involving a change in the structure of the native chromosome. Such changes may involve several different classes of events, like deletions, duplications, inversions, and translocations. Usually, these events are caused by a breakage in the DNA double helices at two different locations, followed by a rejoining of the broken ends to produce a new chromosomal arrangement of genes, different from the gene order of the chromosomes before they were broken. Structural chromosomal abnormalities are estimated to occur in around 0.5% of newborn infants.

Some chromosomal regions are more prone to rearrangement than others and thus are the source of genetic diseases and cancer. This instability is usually due to the propensity of these regions to misalign during DNA repair, exacerbated by defects of the appearance of replication proteins (like FEN1 or Pol δ) that ubiquitously affect the integrity of the genome. Complex chromosomal rearrangements (CCR) are rarely seen in the general population and are defined as structural chromosomal rearrangements with at least three breakpoints with exchange of genetic material between two or more chromosomes. Some forms of campomelic dysplasia, for example, result from CCRs.

Heng and Gorelick and Heng reviewed evidence that sexual reproduction helps preserve species identity by acting as a coarse filter, weeding out chromosomal rearrangements, but permitting minor variation, such as changes at the nucleotide or gene level (that are often neutral) to pass through the sexual sieve.

In the liver of mice, genome rearrangements do not increase with age until after 27 months when they increase rapidly. In mouse brain the frequency of genome rearrangements is lower than in liver and this frequency does not increase with age.

It is possible that speciation frequently occurs when a population becomes fixed for one or more chromosomal rearrangements that reduce fitness when they are heterozygous. This theory is lacking in theoretical support because mutations that cause a large reduction in fitness can only be fixed through genetic drift in small, inbred populations, and the effects of chromosomal rearrangements on fitness are unpredictable and vary greatly in plant and animal species. However, a potential mechanism that could promote speciation is that rearrangements reduce gene flow more by suppressing recombination (and extending the effects of linked isolation genes) than by reducing fitness.

Exemplifying (extensive) chromosome rearrangements can be found in the complete and haplotype-resolved African cassava (TME204) genome that was reconstructed and made available using the Hi-C technology.
