= Secondary constriction =

Schematic karyogram of a human. Each row is vertically aligned at centromere level. The top of chromosomes 13, 14, 15, 21, & 22 are satellites, with a secondary constriction between the satellite and the centromere.

Secondary constrictions are the constricted or the narrow region found at any point of the chromosome other than that of centromere (primary constriction). The difference between the two constrictions can be noticed during anaphase, as chromosomes can only bend at the site of primary constriction. Secondary constrictions are useful in identifying a chromosome from a set. There are either 0, 1, 2, 3, or 4 secondary constriction sites in a cell at anaphase. Some parts of these constrictions indicate sites of nucleolus formation and are called "nucleolar organizing regions" (NORs). The nucleolus in the nucleus remains associated with the NOR of the secondary constriction area. In humans, the number of NORs is equal to the number of nucleoli, which is ten. However, not all secondary constrictions are NORs. The formations of nucleoli takes place around the NOR region. The secondary constriction also contains the genes for rRNA synthesis (18S rRNA, 5.8S rRNA, and 28S rRNA). Genes for 5S rRNA are present on chromosome 1. Due to secondary constriction, a knob-like structure is formed at the end called a satellite chromosome (SAT chromosome). DNA in a secondary constriction which forms rRNA is called rDNA..

NORs occur in SAT chromosomes (13,14,15,21,22).
