= Chromosome regions =

All chromosomes in prokaryotes and eukaryotes can be subdivided into various chromosome regions. However, the most common ones are those occurring in the chromosomes of eukaryotes, especially those that are visible in condensed chromosomes that become visible at metaphase during cell division.

Each of these regions is covered in separate articles on Wikipedia.

- Arms (p and q)
- Centromere
- Kinetochore
- Telomere
- Sub telomere
- satellite chromosome or trabant.
- NOR region
- Satellite chromosome
