= International System for Human Cytogenomic Nomenclature =

System for describing human chromosomes

The International System for Human Cytogenomic Nomenclature (ISCN; previously the International System for Human Cytogenetic Nomenclature) is an international standard for human chromosome nomenclature, which includes band names, symbols, and abbreviated terms used in the description of human chromosome and chromosome abnormalities.

The ISCN has been used as the central reference among cytogeneticists since 1960.

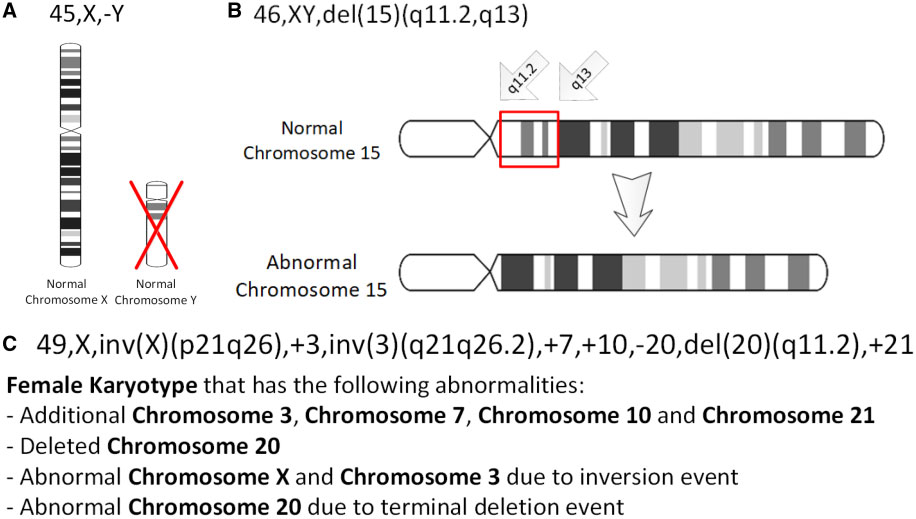
Three chromosomal abnormalities with ISCN nomenclature, with increasing complexity: (A) A tumour karyotype in a male with loss of the Y chromosome, (B) Prader–Willi Syndrome i.e. deletion in the 15q11-q12 region and (C) an arbitrary karyotype that involves a variety of autosomal and allosomal abnormalities.

Human karyotype with annotated bands and sub-bands as used for the nomenclature of chromosome abnormalities. It shows dark and white regions as seen on G banding. Each row is vertically aligned at centromere level. It shows 22 homologous autosomal chromosome pairs, both the female (XX) and male (XY) versions of the two sex chromosomes, as well as the mitochondrial genome (at bottom left).

Abbreviations of this system include a minus sign (-) for chromosome deletions, and del for deletions of parts of a chromosome.

== Revision history ==
- ISCN (2024). S. Karger Publishing. ISBN 978-3-318-07331-7. Also published as Cytogenet Genome Res 2024;164(suppl 1):1–224, doi:10.1159/000538512.
- ISCN (2020). S. Karger Publishing. ISBN 978-3318068672
- ISCN (2016). S. Karger Publishing. ISBN 978-3318058574
- ISCN (2013). S. Karger Publishing. ISBN 978-3318022537
- ISCN (2009). S. Karger Publishing. ISBN 978-3805589857
- ISCN (2005). S. Karger Publishing. ISBN 978-3805580199
- ISCN (1995). S. Karger Publishing. ISBN 978-3805562263
- ISCN (1991). S. Karger Publishing. ISBN 978-3805555678
- ISCN (1985). S. Karger Publishing. ISBN 978-3805538701
- ISCN (1981). S. Karger Publishing. ISBN 978-3805534840
- ISCN (1978). S. Karger Publishing. ISBN 978-3805530118
- Paris Conference (1971): "Standardization in Human Cytogenetics." (PDF) Birth Defects: Original Article Series, Vol 8, No 7 (The National Foundation, New York 1972)
- Chicago Conference (1966): "Standardization in Human Cytogenetics." Birth Defects: Original Article Series, Vol 2, No 2 (The National Foundation, New York 1966).
- London Conference (1963): "London Conference on the Normal Human Karyotype." Cytogenetics 2:264–268 (1963)
- Denver Conference (1960): "A proposed standard system of nomenclature of human mitotic chromosomes." The Lancet 275.7133 (1960): 1063-1065.

== See also ==
- Locus (genetics)
- Cytogenetic notation
