= Neochromosome =

A neochromosome is a chromosome that is not normally found in nature. Cancer-associated neochromosomes are found in some cancer cells.

Neochromosomes have also been created using genetic engineering techniques.

== Cancer-associated neochromosomes ==
Cancer-associated neochromosomes are giant supernumerary chromosomes. They harbor the mutations that drive certain cancers (highly amplified copies of key oncogenes, such as MDM2, CDK4, HMGA2). They may be circular or linear chromosomes. They have functional centromeres, and telomeres when linear. They are rare overall, being found in about 3% of cancers, but are common in certain rare cancers. For example, they are found in 90% of parosteal osteosarcomas.

Neochromosomes from well- and de-differentiated liposarcoma have been studied at high resolution by isolation (using flow sorting) and sequencing, as well as microscopy. They consist of hundreds of fragments of DNA, often derived from multiple normal chromosomes, stitched together randomly, and contain high levels of DNA amplification (~30-60 copies of some genes).

Using statistical inference and mathematical modelling, the process of how neochromosomes initially form and evolve has been made clearer. Fragments of DNA produced following chromothriptic shattering of chromosome 12 undergo DNA repair to form of a circular or ring chromosome. This undergoes hundreds of circular breakage-fusion-bridge cycles, causing random amplification and deletion of DNA with selection for the amplification of key oncogenes. DNA from additional chromosomes is somehow added during this process. Erosion of centromeres can lead to the formation of neocentromeres or the capture of new native centromeres from other chromosomes. The process ends when the neochromosome forms a linear chromosome following the capture of telomeric caps, which can be chromothriptically derived.
