= Dicentric chromosome =

A dicentric chromosome is an abnormal chromosome with two centromeres. It is formed through the fusion of two chromosome segments, each with a centromere, resulting in the loss of acentric fragments (lacking a centromere) and the formation of dicentric fragments. The formation of dicentric chromosomes has been attributed to genetic processes, such as Robertsonian translocation and paracentric inversion. Dicentric chromosomes have important roles in the mitotic stability of chromosomes and the formation of pseudodicentric chromosomes. Their existence has been linked to certain natural phenomena such as irradiation and have been documented to underlie certain clinical syndromes, notably Kabuki syndrome. The formation of dicentric chromosomes and their implications on centromere function are studied in certain clinical cytogenetics laboratories.

== Formation ==
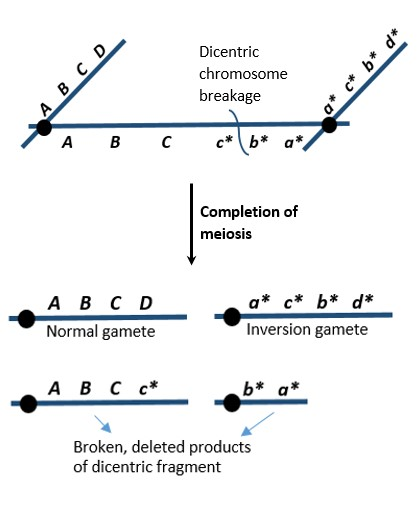
After a paracentric inversion, separation of the inverted chromosomes in anaphase I result in the formation of dicentric and acentric fragments. The dicentric fragments become broken, deleted products. The acentric fragments are simply lost.

Most dicentric chromosomes are known to form through chromosomal inversions, which are rotations in regions of a chromosome due to chromosomal breakages or intra-chromosomal recombinations. Inversions that exclude the centromere are known as paracentric inversions, which result in unbalanced gametes after meiosis. During prophase of meiosis I, homologous chromosomes form an inversion loop and crossover occurs. If a paracentric inversion has occurred, one of the products will be acentric, while the other product will be dicentric. The dicentric chromatid is pulled apart during anaphase of meiosis I with such force that the chromosome breaks at random positions. These broken fragments result in deletions of genes that lead to genetically unbalanced gametes. This can have severe consequences, contributing to the development of genetic disorders such as Kabuki syndrome and Edwards syndrome.

Irradiation

Radiation is known to induce abnormalities in the nuclei of cells. Dicentric chromosomes were first detected in lymphocytes from blood smears of civil and military personnel who were assigned to deal with the aftermath of the 1986 Chernobyl nuclear disaster (liquidators). Radiation increases the probability that dicentric chromosomes form after every mitotic event, creating physical bridges between them in anaphase and telophase. As these chromosomes are pulled apart, the chromosome bridges break, resulting in the formation of "tailed" nuclei, protrusions of the nuclei into the cytoplasm.

Telomeres

When telomeres of chromosomes shorten with continued cell divisions, the chromosome ends may also fuse, forming dicentric chromosomes. This is considered "crisis", a type of cell cycle arrest, and most cells in this state suffer apoptosis. The resulting dicentric chromosomes are highly unstable, giving rise to chromosomal translocations, deletions and amplifications, such as the Robertsonian translocation. This results in broken, deleted gene products of dicentric fragments.

== Applications ==
Dicentric chromosomes are studied in model organisms such as yeast (Saccharomyces cerevisiae). The use of S. cerevisiae as a classical genetic system dates back to the 1950s due to its feasibility in transformation by recombinant DNA. Broken chromosomes that lead to acentric and dicentric fragments can be studied in S. cerevisiae due to its known ability to tolerate aneuploidy, an abnormal number of chromosomes. Strains of S. cerevisiae that tolerate aneuploidy can stabilize products of broken chromosomes during proliferation, which can be recovered and studied in a laboratory setting.

Cytogenetics

Centromere function has been the focus of many laboratory analyses, involving techniques like fluorescence in situ hybridization (FISH) and chromosomal banding (C-banding). FISH involves the use of fluorescent probes to detect and localize specific DNA sequences on chromosomes, and centromere-specific probes can be used to measure dicentric chromosome frequencies. This technique allows for the testing of human blood samples and tissue samples, which have been historically adopted by radiation laboratories. C-banding is a staining technique that can be used to visualize dicentric chromosomes. It specifically stains constitutive heterochromatin, which are regions of the chromosome at or near the centromere.

== Consequences ==
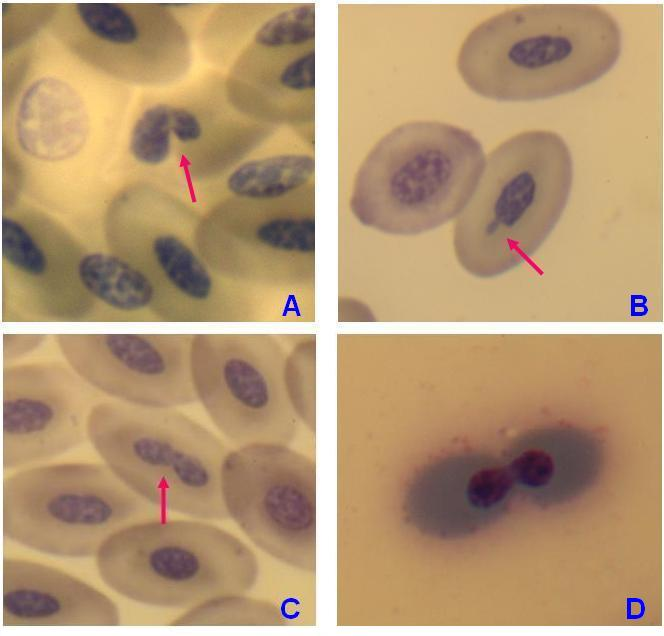
The presence of "tailed" nuclei (B) in irradiated cells are considered biomarkers of dicentric chromosome formation.

The existence of dicentric chromosomes has clinically relevant consequences for individuals, which may live with intellectual, neurological and physical disabilities. Tailed nuclei are signatures of radiation exposure in human tissue, microbiota, and aquatic invertebrates from the wake of recent nuclear disasters. Additionally, they are used as potential biomarkers to screen for certain genetic syndromes present in human populations.

Pseudodicentric chromosomes

Dicentric chromosomes may lead to pseudodicentric mutations, in which one of the centromeres on the chromosome becomes inactivated. This can have severe clinical consequences for patients, as observed in severe progressive neurological and intellectual disorders such as Kabuki syndrome, a pediatric congenital disorder. Kabuki syndrome is one of the most widely studied syndromes that involve the pseudodicentric chromosome. Other characterized syndromes have also been linked to pseudodicentric chromosomes, such as Edwards syndrome, a trisomy of chromosome 18, and Turner syndrome, a loss (or partial loss) of the X chromosome. Pseudodicentric chromosomes alone do not define these syndromes, because the contribution of other chromosomal abnormalities are also considered, such as the presence of isochromosomes in Turner patients.

== See also ==
- Chromosomal inversion
- Telomeres
- Cytogenetics
- Nuclear radiation
- Intellectual disorders
