= Chimeric gene =

New gene produced by the combined portions of multiple coding sequences

Chimeric genes (literally, made of parts from different sources) form through the combination of portions of two or more coding sequences to produce new genes. These mutations are distinct from fusion genes which merge whole gene sequences into a single reading frame and often retain their original functions.

== Formation ==
Chimeric genes can form through several different means. Many chimeric genes form through errors in DNA replication or DNA repair so that pieces of two different genes are inadvertently combined. Chimeric genes can also form through retrotransposition where a retrotransposon accidentally copies the transcript of a gene and inserts it into the genome in a new location. Depending on where the new retrogene appears, it can recruit new exons to produce a chimeric gene. Chimeric genes can also form through Ectopic recombination, where there is an exchange between portions of the genome that are not actually related. This process occurs often in human genomes, and abnormal chimeras formed by this process are known to cause color blindness. Finally, chimeric symbiogenetic genes (S-genes) are formed by the fusion of gene fragments from endosymbionts, organisms living within the body or cells of another organism. A naturally occurring example of this is a chimeric gene called "Booster", which boosts photosynthesis in poplar trees. It contains fused segments of genetic code from a bacteria which lives in poplar roots, from an ant which farms a fungus which infects poplar, and from chloroplasts in poplar cells.

== Evolutionary Importance of Fusion Proteins ==
Chimeric genes are important players in the evolution of genetic novelty. Much like gene duplications, they provide a source of new genes, which can allow organisms to develop new phenotypes and adapt to their environment. Unlike duplicate genes, chimeric proteins are immediately distinct from their parental genes, and therefore are more likely to produce entirely new functions.

Chimeric fusion proteins form often in genomes, and many of these are likely to be dysfunctional and eliminated by natural selection. However, in some cases, these new peptides can form fully functional gene products that are selectively favored and spread through populations quickly.

== Functions ==
One of the most well known chimeric genes was identified in Drosophila and has been named Jingwei. This gene is formed from a retrotransposed copy of Alcohol dehydrogenase that united with the yellow emperor gene to produce a new protein. The new amino acid residues that it recruited from yellow emperor allow the new protein to act on long chain alcohols and diols, including growth hormones and pheremones. These changes affect fly development. In this case, the combination of different protein domains resulted in a gene that was fully functional and favored by selection.

The functions of many chimeric genes are not yet known. In some cases these gene products are not beneficial and they may even cause diseases such as cancer.
