= R‑banding =

R-banding is a cytogenetics technique that produces the reverse of the G-band stain on chromosomes. R-banding is obtained by incubating the slides in hot phosphate buffer, then a subsequent treatment of giemsa dye. Resulting chromosome patterns shows darkly stained R bands, the complement to G-bands. Darkly colored R bands are guanine-cytosine rich, and adenine-thymine rich regions are more readily denatured by heat. The technique is useful for analyzing genetic deletions or chromosomal translocations that involve the telomeres of chromosomes.
