= Parasitic chromosome =

Genetic segments that confer no benefit

Parasitic chromosomes are "selfish" chromosomes that propagate throughout cell divisions, even if they confer no benefit to the overall organism's survival. Parasitic chromosomes can persist even if slightly detrimental to survival, as is characteristic of some selfish genetic elements. Parasitic chromosomes are often B chromosomes, such that they are not necessarily present in the majority of the species population and are not needed for basic life functions, in contrast to A chromosomes. Parasitic chromosomes are classified as selfish genetic elements.

Parasitic chromosomes, if detrimental to an organism's survival, often are selected against by natural selection over time, but if the chromosome is able to act like a selfish DNA element, it can spread throughout a population. An example of a parasitic chromosome is the b24 chromosome in grasshoppers.
