= Ectopic recombination =

Crossing over at non-homologous loci

Ectopic recombination is an atypical form of recombination in which a crossing over takes place between two homologous DNA sequences located at non-allelic chromosomal positions. Such recombination often results in dramatic chromosomal rearrangement, which is generally harmful to the organism. Some research, however, has suggested that ectopic recombination can result in mutated chromosomes that benefit the organism. Ectopic recombination can occur during both meiosis and mitosis, although it is more likely occur during meiosis. It occurs relatively frequently—in at least one yeast species (Saccharomyces cerevisiae) the frequency of ectopic recombination is roughly on par with that of allelic (or traditional) recombination. If the alleles at two loci are heterozygous, then ectopic recombination is relatively likely to occur, whereas if the alleles are homozygous, they will almost certainly undergo allelic recombination. Ectopic recombination does not require loci involved to be close to one another; it can occur between loci that are widely separated on a single chromosome, and has even been known to occur across chromosomes. Neither does it require high levels of homology between sequences—the lower limit required for it to occur has been estimated at as low as 2.2 kb of homologous stretches of DNA nucleotides.

In tobacco plant somatic cells, DNA double-strand break-induced recombination between ectopic homologous sequences appears to serve as a minor DNA repair pathway for double-strand breaks.

The role of transposable elements in ectopic recombination is an area of active inquiry. Transposable elements—repetitious sequences of DNA that can insert themselves into any part of the genome—can encourage ectopic recombination at repeated homologous sequences of nucleotides. However, according to one proposed model, ectopic recombination might serve as an inhibitor of high transposable element copy numbers. The frequency of ectopic recombination of transposable elements has been linked to both higher copy numbers of transposable elements and the longer lengths of those elements. Since ectopic recombination is generally deleterious, anything that increases its odds of occurring is selected against, including the aforementioned higher copy numbers and longer lengths. This model, however, can only be applied to single families of transposable elements in the genome, as the probability of ectopic recombination occurring in one TE family is independent of it occurring in another. It follows that transposable elements that are shorter, transpose themselves less often, and have mutation rates high enough to disrupt the homology between transposable element sequences sufficiently to prevent ectopic recombination from occurring are selected for.
