= Satellite chromosome =

Type of chromosome with a special constriction

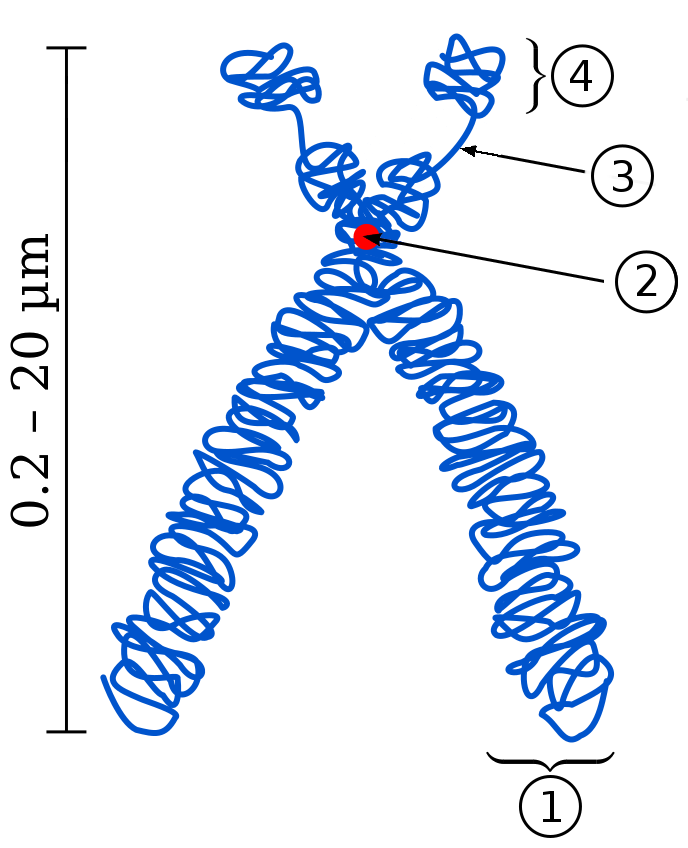
Sketch of a satellite chromosome. (1) Chromatid. (2) Centromere. (3) Secondary constriction. (4) Satellite.

Schematic karyogram of a human. Each row is vertically aligned at centromere level. The top of chromosomes 13, 14, 15, 21, & 22 are satellites, with a secondary constriction between the satellite and the centromere.

Satellite chromosomes or SAT-chromosomes are chromosomes that contain secondary constrictions. They are observed in acrocentric chromosomes. In addition to the centromere which represents the primary constriction, one or more secondary constrictions can be observed in some chromosomes at metaphase. In humans they are usually associated with the short arm of an acrocentric chromosome, such as in the chromosomes 13, 14, 15, 21, & 22. The Y chromosome can also contain satellites, although these are thought to be translocations from autosomes. The secondary constriction always keeps its position, so it can be used as markers to identify specific chromosomes.

The name derives from the small chromosomal segment behind the secondary constriction, called a satellite, named by Sergei Navashin, in 1912. Later, Heitz (1931) qualified the secondary constriction as the SAT state (Sine Acido Thymonucleinico, which means "without thymonucleic acid"), because it didn't stain with the Feulgen reaction. With time, the term "SAT-chromosome" became an abbreviation for satellite chromosome.

The satellite at metaphase appears to be attached to the chromosomes by a thread of chromatin.

SAT-chromosomes whose secondary constriction is associated with the formation of the nucleolus are referred to as nucleolar SAT-chromosomes. There are at least 4 SAT-chromosomes in each diploid nucleus, and the constriction corresponds to a nucleolar organizer (NOR), a region containing multiple copies of the 18S and 28S ribosomal genes that synthesize ribosomal RNA required by ribosomes. The appearance of secondary constrictions at NORs is thought to be due to rRNA transcription and/or structural features of the nucleolus impeding chromosome condensation.
