= Karyotype =

Photographic display of total chromosome complement in a cell

A karyotype is the general appearance of the complete set of chromosomes in the cells of a species or in an individual organism, mainly including their sizes, numbers, and shapes. Karyotyping is the process by which a karyotype is discerned by determining the chromosome complement of an individual, including the number of chromosomes and any abnormalities.

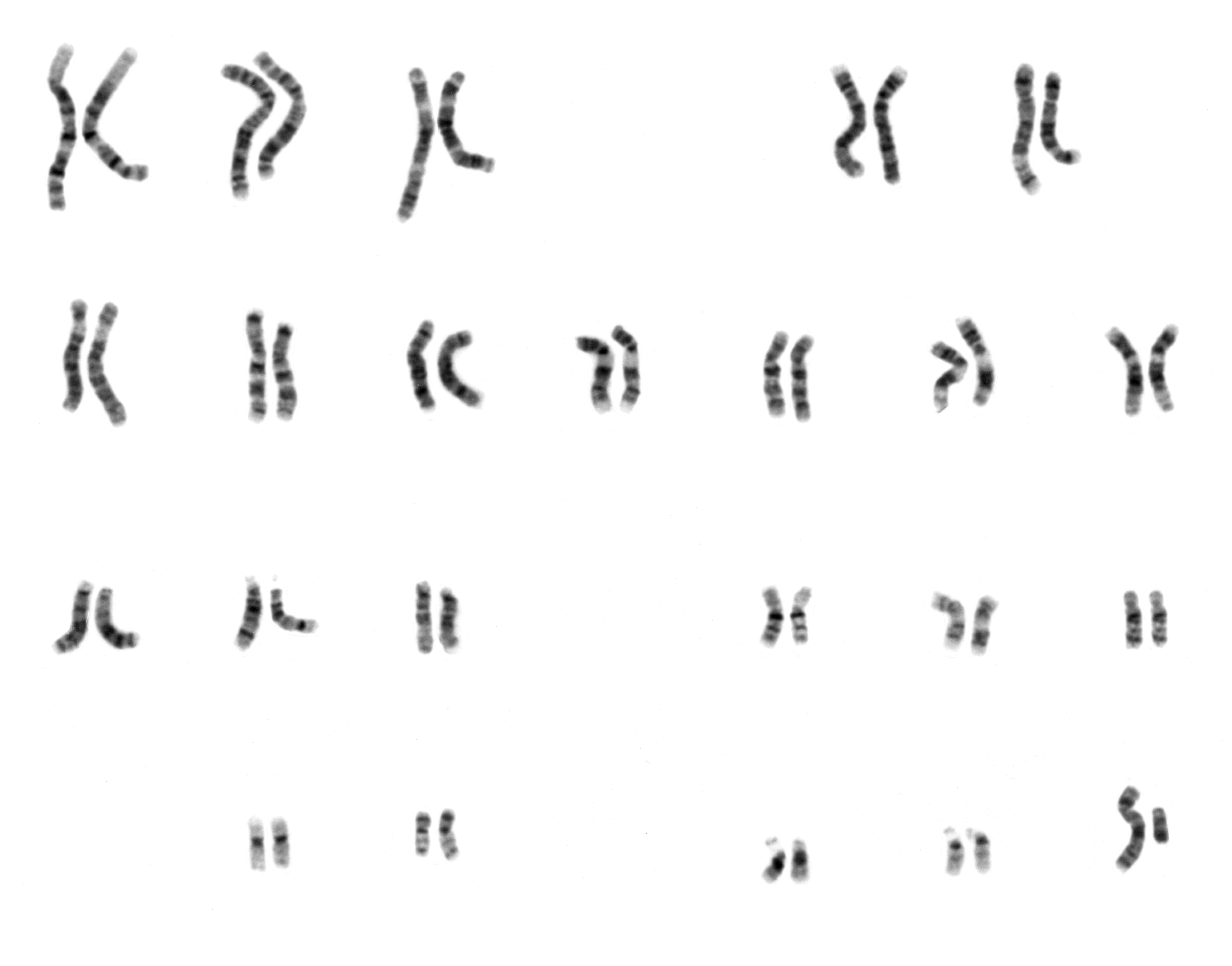
Micrographic karyogram of human male using Giemsa staining

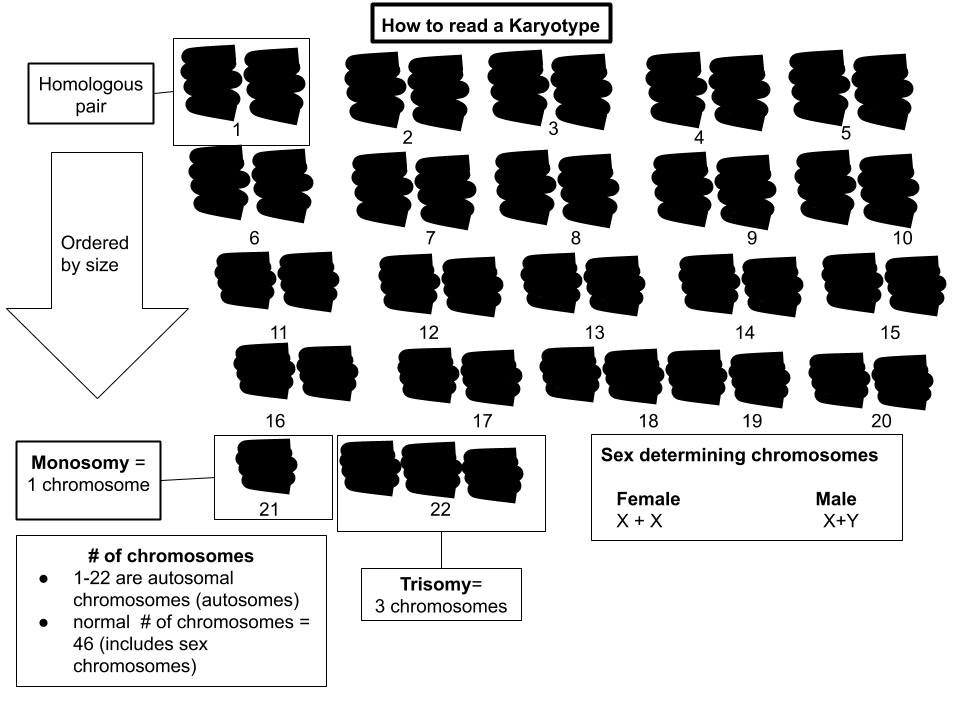
Schematic karyogram demonstrating the basic knowledge needed to read a karyotype

A karyogram or idiogram is a graphical depiction of a karyotype, wherein chromosomes are generally organized in pairs, ordered by size and position of centromere for chromosomes of the same size. Karyotyping generally combines light microscopy and photography in the metaphase of the cell cycle, and results in a photomicrographic (or simply micrographic) karyogram. In contrast, a schematic karyogram is a designed graphic representation of a karyotype. In schematic karyograms, just one of the sister chromatids of each chromosome is generally shown for brevity, and in reality they are generally so close together that they look as one on photomicrographs as well unless the resolution is high enough to distinguish them. The study of whole sets of chromosomes is sometimes known as karyology.

Karyotypes describe the chromosome count of an organism and what these chromosomes look like under a light microscope. Attention is paid to their length, the position of the centromeres, banding pattern, any differences between the sex chromosomes, and any other physical characteristics. The preparation and study of karyotypes is part of cytogenetics.

The basic number of chromosomes in the somatic cells of an individual or a species is called the somatic number and is designated 2n. In the germ-line (the sex cells) the chromosome number is n (humans: n = 23).^{p28} As such, in humans 2n = 46.

In normal diploid organisms, autosomal chromosomes are present in two copies. There can potentially be sex chromosomes. Polyploid cells have multiple copies of chromosomes and haploid cells have single copies.

Karyotypes can be used for many purposes, such as to study chromosomal aberrations, cellular function, and taxonomic relationships, to aid in medical research, and to gather information about past evolutionary events (karyosystematics).

== Observations on karyotypes ==
Chromosomes at various stages of mitosis. Karyograms are generally made by chromosomes in prometaphase or metaphase. During these phases, the two copies of each chromosome (connected at the centromere) will look as one unless the image resolution is high enough to distinguish the two.

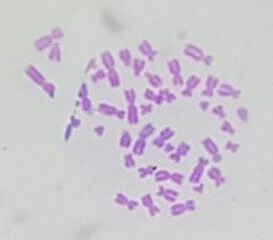
Micrograph of human chromosomes before further processing. Staining with Giemsa confers a purple color to chromosomes, but micrographs are often converted to grayscale to facilitate data presentation and make comparisons of results from different laboratories.

=== Staining ===
The study of karyotypes is made possible by staining. Usually, a suitable dye, such as Giemsa, is applied after cells have been arrested during cell division by a solution of colchicine usually in metaphase or prometaphase when most condensed. In order for the Giemsa stain to adhere correctly, all chromosomal proteins must be digested and removed. For humans, white blood cells are used most frequently because they are easily induced to divide and grow in tissue culture. Sometimes observations may be made on non-dividing (interphase) cells. The sex of an unborn fetus can be predicted by observation of interphase cells (see amniotic centesis and Barr body).

=== Observations ===
Six different characteristics of karyotypes are usually observed and compared:

1. Differences in absolute sizes of chromosomes. Chromosomes can vary in absolute size by as much as twenty-fold between genera of the same family. For example, the legumes Lotus tenuis and Vicia faba each have six pairs of chromosomes, yet V. faba chromosomes are many times larger. These differences probably reflect different amounts of DNA duplication.
2. Differences in the position of centromeres. These differences probably came about through translocations.
3. Differences in relative size of chromosomes. These differences probably arose from segmental interchange of unequal lengths.
4. Differences in basic number of chromosomes. These differences could have resulted from successive unequal translocations which removed all the essential genetic material from a chromosome, permitting its loss without penalty to the organism (the dislocation hypothesis) or through fusion. Humans have one pair fewer chromosomes than the great apes. Human chromosome 2 appears to have resulted from the fusion of two ancestral chromosomes, and many of the genes of those two original chromosomes have been translocated to other chromosomes.
5. Differences in number and position of satellites. Satellites are small bodies attached to a chromosome by a thin thread.
6. Differences in degree and distribution of GC content (Guanine-Cytosine pairs versus Adenine-Thymine). In metaphase where the karyotype is typically studied, all DNA is condensed, but most of the time, DNA with a high GC content is usually less condensed, that is, it tends to appear as euchromatin rather than heterochromatin. GC rich DNA tends to contain more coding DNA and be more transcriptionally active. GC rich DNA is lighter on Giemsa staining. Euchromatin regions contain larger amounts of Guanine-Cytosine pairs (that is, it has a higher GC content). The staining technique using Giemsa staining is called G banding and therefore produces the typical "G-Bands".

A full account of a karyotype may therefore include the number, type, shape and banding of the chromosomes, as well as other cytogenetic information.

Variation is often found:

1. between the sexes,
2. between the germ-line and soma (between gametes and the rest of the body),
3. between members of a population (chromosome polymorphism),
4. in geographic specialization, and
5. in mosaics or otherwise abnormal individuals.

== Human karyogram ==
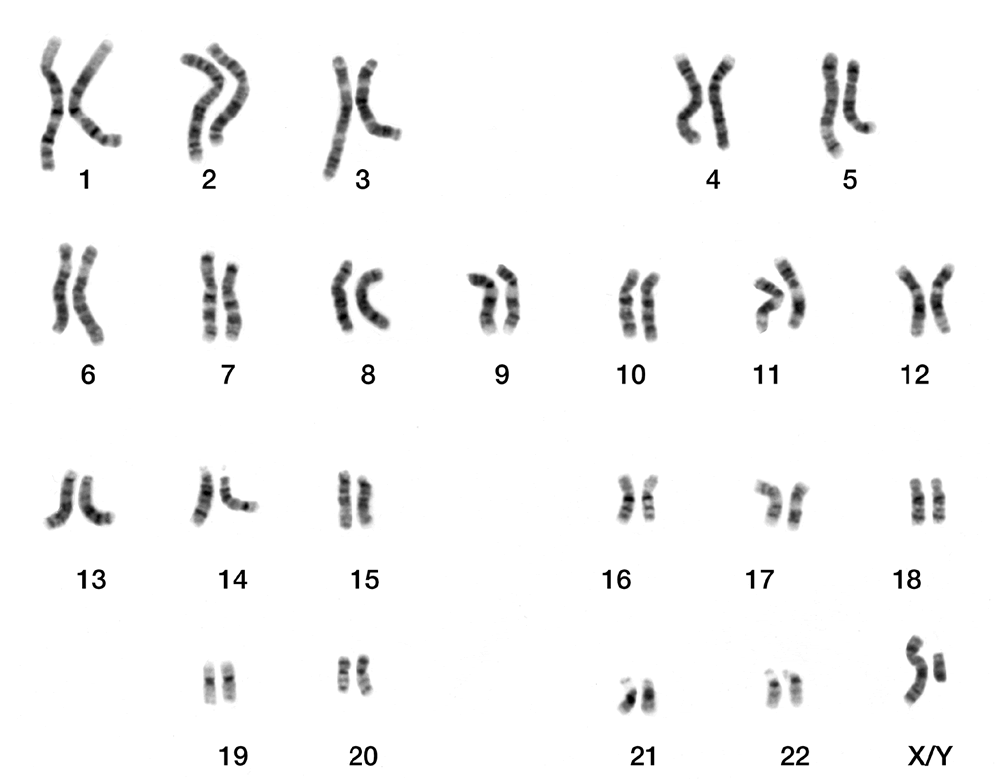
Micrographic karyogram of a human male. See section text for details.

Schematic karyogram of a human. Even at low magnification, it gives an overview of the human genome, with numbered chromosome pairs, its main changes during the cell cycle (top center), and the mitochondrial genome to scale (at bottom left). See section text for more details.

Both the micrographic and schematic karyograms shown in this section have a standard chromosome layout, and display darker and lighter regions as seen on G banding, which is the appearance of the chromosomes after treatment with trypsin (to partially digest the chromosomes) and staining with Giemsa stain. Compared to darker regions, the lighter regions are generally more transcriptionally active, with a greater ratio of coding DNA versus non-coding DNA, and a higher GC content.

Both the micrographic and schematic karyograms show the normal human diploid karyotype, which is the typical composition of the genome within a normal cell of the human body, and which contains 22 pairs of autosomal chromosomes and one pair of sex chromosomes (allosomes). A major exception to diploidy in humans is gametes (sperm and egg cells) which are haploid with 23 unpaired chromosomes, and this ploidy is not shown in these karyograms. The micrographic karyogram is converted into grayscale, whereas the schematic karyogram shows the purple hue as typically seen on Giemsa stain (and is a result of its azure B component, which stains DNA purple).

The schematic karyogram in this section is a graphical representation of the idealized karyotype. For each chromosome pair, the scale to the left shows the length in terms of million base pairs, and the scale to the right shows the designations of the bands and sub-bands. Such bands and sub-bands are used by the International System for Human Cytogenomic Nomenclature to describe locations of chromosome abnormalities. Each row of chromosomes is vertically aligned at centromere level.

=== Human chromosome groups ===
Based on the karyogram characteristics of size, position of the centromere and sometimes the presence of a chromosomal satellite (a segment distal to a secondary constriction), the human chromosomes are classified into the following groups:

Group	Chromosomes	Features
A	1–3	Large, metacentric or submetacentric
B	4–5	Large, submetacentric
C	6–12, X	Medium-sized, submetacentric
D	13–15	Medium-sized, acrocentric, with satellite
E	16–18	Small, metacentric or submetacentric
F	19–20	Very small, metacentric
G	21–22, Y	Very small, acrocentric (and 21, 22 with satellite)

Alternatively, the human genome can be classified as follows, based on pairing, sex differences, as well as location within the cell nucleus versus inside mitochondria:

- 22 homologous autosomal chromosome pairs (chromosomes 1 to 22). Homologous means that they have the same genes in the same loci, and autosomal means that they are not sex chromomes.
- Two sex chromosome (in green rectangle at bottom right in the schematic karyogram, with adjacent silhouettes of typical representative phenotypes): The most common karyotypes for females contain two X chromosomes and are denoted 46,XX; males usually have both an X and a Y chromosome denoted 46,XY. However, approximately 0.018% percent of humans are intersex, sometimes due to variations in sex chromosomes.
- The human mitochondrial genome (shown at bottom left in the schematic karyogram, to scale compared to the nuclear DNA in terms of base pairs), although this is not included in micrographic karyograms in clinical practice. Its genome is relatively tiny compared to the rest.

=== Copy number ===
The cell cycle

Schematic karyograms generally display a DNA copy number corresponding to the G_{0} phase of the cellular state (outside of the replicative cell cycle) which is the most common state of cells. The schematic karyogram in this section also shows this state. In this state (as well as during the G_{1} phase of the cell cycle), each cell has two autosomal chromosomes of each kind (designated 2n), where each chromosome has one copy of each locus, making a total copy number of two for each locus (2c). At top center in the schematic karyogram, it also shows the chromosome 3 pair after having undergone DNA synthesis, occurring in the S phase (annotated as S) of the cell cycle. This interval includes the G_{2} phase and metaphase (annotated as "Meta."). During this interval, there is still 2n, but each chromosome will have two copies of each locus, wherein each sister chromatid (chromosome arm) is connected at the centromere, for a total of 4c. The chromosomes on micrographic karyograms are in this state as well, because they are generally micrographed in metaphase, but during this phase the two copies of each chromosome are so close to each other that they appear as one unless the image resolution is high enough to distinguish them. In reality, during the G_{0} and G_{1} phases, nuclear DNA is dispersed as chromatin and does not show visually distinguishable chromosomes even on micrography.

The copy number of the human mitochondrial genome per human cell varies from 0 (erythrocytes) up to 1,500,000 (oocytes), mainly depending on the number of mitochondria per cell.

== Diversity and evolution of karyotypes ==
Although the replication and transcription of DNA is highly standardized in eukaryotes, the same cannot be said for their karyotypes, which are highly variable. There is variation between species in chromosome number, and in detailed organization, despite their construction from the same macromolecules. This variation provides the basis for a range of studies in evolutionary cytology.

In some cases there is even significant variation within species. In a review, Godfrey and Masters conclude:

In our view, it is unlikely that one process or the other can independently account for the wide range of karyotype structures that are observed ... But, used in conjunction with other phylogenetic data, karyotypic fissioning may help to explain dramatic differences in diploid numbers between closely related species, which were previously inexplicable.

Although much is known about karyotypes at the descriptive level, and it is clear that changes in karyotype organization has had effects on the evolutionary course of many species, it is quite unclear what the general significance might be.

We have a very poor understanding of the causes of karyotype evolution, despite many careful investigations ... the general significance of karyotype evolution is obscure.

— Maynard Smith

=== Changes during development ===
Instead of the usual gene repression, some organisms go in for large-scale elimination of heterochromatin, or other kinds of visible adjustment to the karyotype.

- Chromosome elimination. In some species, as in many sciarid flies, entire chromosomes are eliminated during development.
- Chromatin diminution (founding father: Theodor Boveri). In this process, found in some copepods and roundworms such as Ascaris suum, portions of the chromosomes are cast away in particular cells. This process is a carefully organised genome rearrangement where new telomeres are constructed and certain heterochromatin regions are lost. In A. suum, all the somatic cell precursors undergo chromatin diminution.
- X-inactivation. The inactivation of one X chromosome takes place during the early development of mammals (see Barr body and dosage compensation). In placental mammals, the inactivation is random as between the two Xs; thus the mammalian female is a mosaic in respect of her X chromosomes. In marsupials it is always the paternal X which is inactivated. In human females some 15% of somatic cells escape inactivation, and the number of genes affected on the inactivated X chromosome varies between cells: in fibroblast cells up about 25% of genes on the Barr body escape inactivation.

=== Number of chromosomes in a set ===
A spectacular example of variability between closely related species is the muntjac, which was investigated by Kurt Benirschke and Doris Wurster. The diploid number of the Chinese muntjac, Muntiacus reevesi, was found to be 46, all telocentric. When they looked at the karyotype of the closely related Indian muntjac, Muntiacus muntjak, they were astonished to find it had female = 6, male = 7 chromosomes.

They simply could not believe what they saw ... They kept quiet for two or three years because they thought something was wrong with their tissue culture ... But when they obtained a couple more specimens they confirmed [their findings].

— Hsu p. 73-4

The number of chromosomes in the karyotype between (relatively) unrelated species is hugely variable. The low record is held by the nematode Parascaris univalens, where the haploid n = 1; and an ant: Myrmecia pilosula. The high record would be somewhere amongst the ferns, with the adder's tongue fern Ophioglossum ahead with an average of 1262 chromosomes. Top score for animals might be the shortnose sturgeon Acipenser brevirostrum at 372 chromosomes. The existence of supernumerary or B chromosomes means that chromosome number can vary even within one interbreeding population; and aneuploids are another example, though in this case they would not be regarded as normal members of the population.

=== Fundamental number ===
The fundamental number, FN, of a karyotype is the number of visible major chromosomal arms per set of chromosomes. Thus, FN ≤ 2 × 2n, the difference depending on the number of chromosomes considered single-armed (acrocentric or telocentric) present. Humans have FN = 82, due to the presence of five acrocentric chromosome pairs: 13, 14, 15, 21, and 22 (the human Y chromosome is also acrocentric). The fundamental autosomal number or autosomal fundamental number, FNa or AN, of a karyotype is the number of visible major chromosomal arms per set of autosomes (non-sex-linked chromosomes).

=== Ploidy ===
Ploidy is the number of complete sets of chromosomes in a cell.

- Polyploidy, where there are more than two sets of homologous chromosomes in the cells, occurs mainly in plants. It has been of major significance in plant evolution according to Stebbins. The proportion of flowering plants which are polyploid was estimated by Stebbins to be 30–35%, but in grasses the average is much higher, about 70%. Polyploidy in lower plants (ferns, horsetails and psilotales) is also common, and some species of ferns have reached levels of polyploidy far in excess of the highest levels known in flowering plants. Polyploidy in animals is much less common, but it has been significant in some groups.

Polyploid series in related species which consist entirely of multiples of a single basic number are known as euploid.

- Haplo-diploidy, where one sex is diploid, and the other haploid. It is a common arrangement in the Hymenoptera, and in some other groups.
- Endopolyploidy occurs when in adult differentiated tissues the cells have ceased to divide by mitosis, but the nuclei contain more than the original somatic number of chromosomes. In the endocycle (endomitosis or endoreduplication) chromosomes in a 'resting' nucleus undergo reduplication, the daughter chromosomes separating from each other inside an intact nuclear membrane.

In many instances, endopolyploid nuclei contain tens of thousands of chromosomes (which cannot be exactly counted). The cells do not always contain exact multiples (powers of two), which is why the simple definition 'an increase in the number of chromosome sets caused by replication without cell division' is not quite accurate.

This process (especially studied in insects and some higher plants such as maize) may be a developmental strategy for increasing the productivity of tissues which are highly active in biosynthesis.

The phenomenon occurs sporadically throughout the eukaryote kingdom from protozoa to humans; it is diverse and complex, and serves differentiation and morphogenesis in many ways.

=== Aneuploidy ===
Aneuploidy is the condition in which the chromosome number in the cells is not the typical number for the species. This would give rise to a chromosome abnormality such as an extra chromosome or one or more chromosomes lost. Abnormalities in chromosome number usually cause a defect in development. Down syndrome and Turner syndrome are examples of this.

Aneuploidy may also occur within a group of closely related species. Classic examples in plants are the genus Crepis, where the gametic (= haploid) numbers form the series x = 3, 4, 5, 6, and 7; and Crocus, where every number from x = 3 to x = 15 is represented by at least one species. Evidence of various kinds shows that trends of evolution have gone in different directions in different groups. In primates, the great apes have 24x2 chromosomes whereas humans have 23x2. Human chromosome 2 was formed by a merger of ancestral chromosomes, reducing the number.

=== Chromosomal polymorphism ===
Some species are polymorphic for different chromosome structural forms. The structural variation may be associated with different numbers of chromosomes in different individuals, which occurs in the ladybird beetle Chilocorus stigma, some mantids of the genus Ameles, the European shrew Sorex araneus. There is some evidence from the case of the mollusc Thais lapillus (the dog whelk) on the Brittany coast, that the two chromosome morphs are adapted to different habitats.

=== Species trees ===
The detailed study of chromosome banding in insects with polytene chromosomes can reveal relationships between closely related species: the classic example is the study of chromosome banding in Hawaiian drosophilids by Hampton L. Carson.

In about 6,500 sq mi (17,000 km^{2}), the Hawaiian Islands have the most diverse collection of drosophilid flies in the world, living from rainforests to subalpine meadows. These roughly 800 Hawaiian drosophilid species are usually assigned to two genera, Drosophila and Scaptomyza, in the family Drosophilidae.

The polytene banding of the 'picture wing' group, the best-studied group of Hawaiian drosophilids, enabled Carson to work out the evolutionary tree long before genome analysis was practicable. In a sense, gene arrangements are visible in the banding patterns of each chromosome. Chromosome rearrangements, especially inversions, make it possible to see which species are closely related.

The results are clear. The inversions, when plotted in tree form (and independent of all other information), show a clear "flow" of species from older to newer islands. There are also cases of colonization back to older islands, and skipping of islands, but these are much less frequent. Using K-Ar dating, the present islands date from 0.4 million years ago (mya) (Mauna Kea) to 10mya (Necker). The oldest member of the Hawaiian archipelago still above the sea is Kure Atoll, which can be dated to 30 mya. The archipelago itself (produced by the Pacific Plate moving over a hot spot) has existed for far longer, at least into the Cretaceous. Previous islands now beneath the sea (guyots) form the Emperor Seamount Chain.

All of the native Drosophila and Scaptomyza species in Hawaiʻi have apparently descended from a single ancestral species that colonized the islands, probably 20 million years ago. The subsequent adaptive radiation was spurred by a lack of competition and a wide variety of niches. Although it would be possible for a single gravid female to colonise an island, it is more likely to have been a group from the same species.

There are other animals and plants on the Hawaiian archipelago which have undergone similar, if less spectacular, adaptive radiations.

=== Chromosome banding ===
Chromosomes display a banded pattern when treated with some stains. Bands are alternating light and dark stripes that appear along the lengths of chromosomes. Unique banding patterns are used to identify chromosomes and to diagnose chromosomal aberrations, including chromosome breakage, loss, duplication, translocation or inverted segments. A range of different chromosome treatments produce a range of banding patterns: G-bands, R-bands, C-bands, Q-bands, T-bands and NOR-bands.

== Depiction of karyotypes ==
=== Types of banding ===
Cytogenetics employs several techniques to visualize different aspects of chromosomes:

- G-banding is obtained with Giemsa stain following digestion of chromosomes with trypsin. It yields a series of lightly and darkly stained bands — the dark regions tend to be heterochromatic, late-replicating and AT rich. The light regions tend to be euchromatic, early-replicating and GC rich. This method will normally produce 300–400 bands in a normal, human genome. It is the most common chromosome banding method.
- R-banding is the reverse of G-banding (the R stands for "reverse"). The dark regions are euchromatic (guanine-cytosine rich regions) and the bright regions are heterochromatic (thymine-adenine rich regions).
- C-banding: Giemsa binds to constitutive heterochromatin, so it stains centromeres. The name is derived from centromeric or constitutive heterochromatin. The preparations undergo alkaline denaturation prior to staining leading to an almost complete depurination of the DNA. After washing the probe the remaining DNA is renatured again and stained with Giemsa solution consisting of methylene azure, methylene violet, methylene blue, and eosin. Heterochromatin binds a lot of the dye, while the rest of the chromosomes absorb only little of it. The C-bonding proved to be especially well-suited for the characterization of plant chromosomes.
- Q-banding is a fluorescent pattern obtained using quinacrine for staining. The pattern of bands is very similar to that seen in G-banding. They can be recognized by a yellow fluorescence of differing intensity. Most part of the stained DNA is heterochromatin. Quinacrin (atebrin) binds both regions rich in AT and in GC, but only the AT-quinacrin-complex fluoresces. Since regions rich in AT are more common in heterochromatin than in euchromatin, these regions are labelled preferentially. The different intensities of the single bands mirror the different contents of AT. Other fluorochromes like DAPI or Hoechst 33258 lead also to characteristic, reproducible patterns. Each of them produces its specific pattern. In other words: the properties of the bonds and the specificity of the fluorochromes are not exclusively based on their affinity to regions rich in AT. Rather, the distribution of AT and the association of AT with other molecules like histones, for example, influences the binding properties of the fluorochromes.
- T-banding: visualize telomeres.
- Silver staining: Silver nitrate stains the nucleolar organization region-associated protein. This yields a dark region where the silver is deposited, denoting the activity of rRNA genes within the NOR.

=== Classic karyotype cytogenetics ===
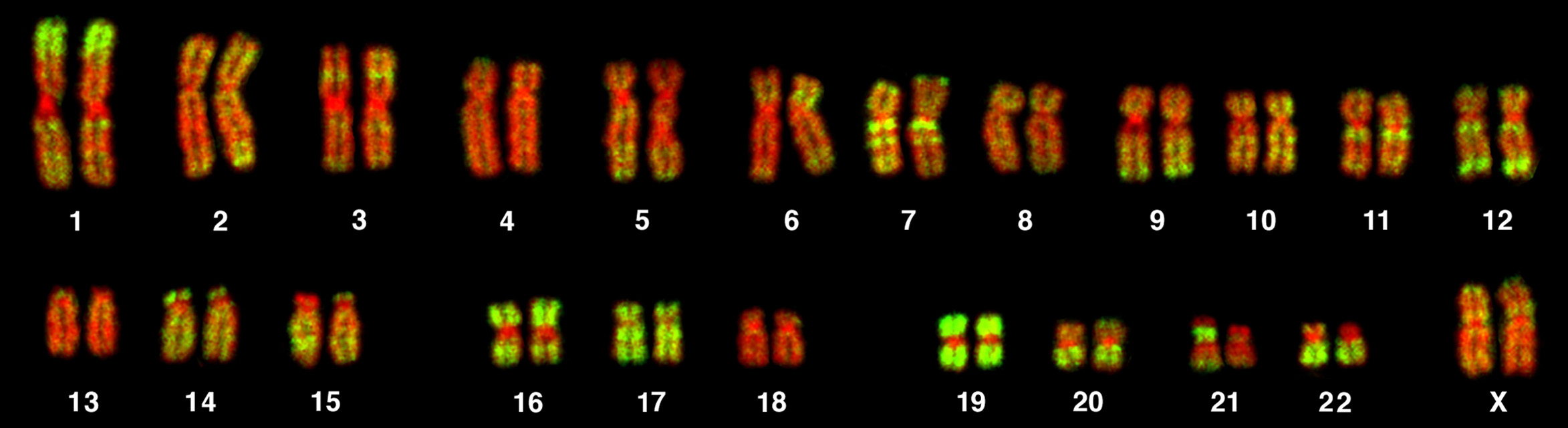
Karyogram from a human female lymphocyte probed for the Alu sequence using FISH

In the "classic" (depicted) karyotype, a dye, often Giemsa (G-banding), less frequently mepacrine (quinacrine), is used to stain bands on the chromosomes. Giemsa is specific for the phosphate groups of DNA. Quinacrine binds to the adenine-thymine-rich regions. Each chromosome has a characteristic banding pattern that helps to identify them; both chromosomes in a pair will have the same banding pattern.

Karyotypes are arranged with the short arm of the chromosome on top, and the long arm on the bottom. Some karyotypes call the short and long arms p and q, respectively. In addition, the differently stained regions and sub-regions are given numerical designations from proximal to distal on the chromosome arms. For example, Cri du chat syndrome involves a deletion on the short arm of chromosome 5. It is written as 46,XX,5p-. The critical region for this syndrome is deletion of p15.2 (the locus on the chromosome), which is written as 46,XX,del(5)(p15.2).

=== Multicolor FISH (mFISH) and spectral karyotype (SKY technique) ===
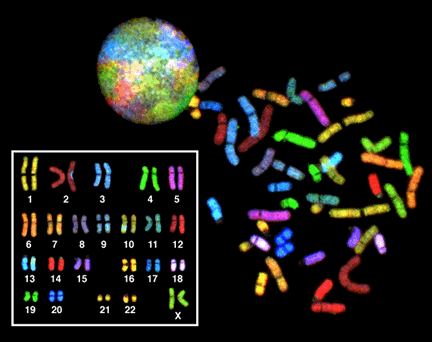
Spectral karyogram of a human female

Multicolor FISH and the older spectral karyotyping are molecular cytogenetic techniques used to simultaneously visualize all the pairs of chromosomes in an organism in different colors. Fluorescently labeled probes for each chromosome are made by labeling chromosome-specific DNA with different fluorophores. Because there are a limited number of spectrally distinct fluorophores, a combinatorial labeling method is used to generate many different colors. Fluorophore combinations are captured and analyzed by a fluorescence microscope using up to 7 narrow-banded fluorescence filters or, in the case of spectral karyotyping, by using an interferometer attached to a fluorescence microscope. In the case of an mFISH image, every combination of fluorochromes from the resulting original images is replaced by a pseudo color in a dedicated image analysis software. Thus, chromosomes or chromosome sections can be visualized and identified, allowing for the analysis of chromosomal rearrangements. In the case of spectral karyotyping, image processing software assigns a pseudo color to each spectrally different combination, allowing the visualization of the individually colored chromosomes.

Spectral human karyotype

Multicolor FISH is used to identify structural chromosome aberrations in cancer cells and other disease conditions when Giemsa banding or other techniques are not accurate enough.

=== Digital karyotyping ===
Digital karyotyping is a technique used to quantify the DNA copy number on a genomic scale. Short sequences of DNA from specific loci all over the genome are isolated and enumerated. This method is also known as virtual karyotyping. Using this technique, it is possible to detect small alterations in the human genome, that cannot be detected through methods employing metaphase chromosomes. Some loci deletions are known to be related to the development of cancer. Such deletions are found through digital karyotyping using the loci associated with cancer development.

== Chromosome abnormalities ==
Chromosome abnormalities can be numerical, as in the presence of extra or missing chromosomes, or structural, as in derivative chromosome, translocations, inversions, large-scale deletions or duplications. Numerical abnormalities, also known as aneuploidy, often occur as a result of nondisjunction during meiosis in the formation of a gamete; trisomies, in which three copies of a chromosome are present instead of the usual two, are common numerical abnormalities. Structural abnormalities often arise from errors in homologous recombination. Both types of abnormalities can occur in gametes and therefore will be present in all cells of an affected person's body, or they can occur during mitosis and give rise to a genetic mosaic individual who has some normal and some abnormal cells.

=== In humans ===
Chromosomal abnormalities that lead to disease in humans include

- Turner syndrome results from a single X chromosome (45,X or 45,X0).
- Klinefelter syndrome, the most common male chromosomal disease, otherwise known as 47,XXY, is caused by an extra X chromosome.
- Edwards syndrome is caused by trisomy (three copies) of chromosome 18.
- Down syndrome, a common chromosomal disease, is caused by trisomy of chromosome 21.
- Patau syndrome is caused by trisomy of chromosome 13.
- Trisomy 9, believed to be the 4th most common trisomy, has many long lived affected individuals but only in a form other than a full trisomy, such as trisomy 9p syndrome or mosaic trisomy 9. They often function quite well, but tend to have trouble with speech.
- Also documented are trisomy 8 and trisomy 16, although they generally do not survive to birth.

Some disorders arise from loss of just a piece of one chromosome, including

- Cri du chat (cry of the cat), from a truncated short arm on chromosome 5. The name comes from the babies' distinctive cry, caused by abnormal formation of the larynx.
- 1p36 Deletion syndrome, from the loss of part of the short arm of chromosome 1.
- Angelman syndrome – 50% of cases have a segment of the long arm of chromosome 15 missing; a deletion of the maternal genes, example of imprinting disorder.
- Prader-Willi syndrome – 50% of cases have a segment of the long arm of chromosome 15 missing; a deletion of the paternal genes, example of imprinting disorder.
- Chromosomal abnormalities can also occur in cancerous cells of an otherwise genetically normal individual; one well-documented example is the Philadelphia chromosome, a translocation mutation commonly associated with chronic myelogenous leukemia and less often with acute lymphoblastic leukemia.

== History of karyotype studies ==
Chromosomes were first observed in plant cells by Carl Wilhelm von Nägeli in 1842. Their behavior in animal (salamander) cells was described by Walther Flemming, the discoverer of mitosis, in 1882. The name was coined by another German anatomist, Heinrich von Waldeyer in 1888. It is Neo-Latin from Ancient Greek κάρυον karyon, "kernel", "seed", or "nucleus", and τύπος typos, "general form")

The next stage took place after the development of genetics in the early 20th century, when it was appreciated that chromosomes (that can be observed by karyotype) were the carrier of genes. The term karyotype as defined by the phenotypic appearance of the somatic chromosomes, in contrast to their genic contents was introduced by Grigory Levitsky who worked with Lev Delaunay, Sergei Navashin, and Nikolai Vavilov. The subsequent history of the concept can be followed in the works of C. D. Darlington and Michael JD White.

Investigation into the human karyotype took many years to settle the most basic question: how many chromosomes does a normal diploid human cell contain? In 1912, Hans von Winiwarter reported 47 chromosomes in spermatogonia and 48 in oogonia, concluding an XX/XO sex determination mechanism. Painter in 1922 was not certain whether the diploid of humans was 46 or 48, at first favoring 46, but revised his opinion from 46 to 48, and he correctly insisted on humans having an XX/XY system. Considering the techniques of the time, these results were remarkable.

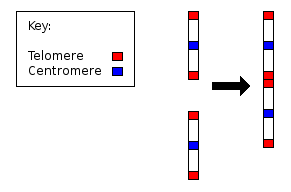
Fusion of ancestral chromosomes left distinctive remnants of telomeres, and a vestigial centromere

Joe Hin Tjio working in Albert Levan's lab found the chromosome count to be 46 using new techniques available at the time:

1. Using cells in tissue culture
2. Pretreating cells in a hypotonic solution, which swells them and spreads the chromosomes
3. Arresting mitosis in metaphase by a solution of colchicine
4. Squashing the preparation on the slide forcing the chromosomes into a single plane
5. Cutting up a photomicrograph and arranging the result into an indisputable karyogram.

The work took place in 1955, and was published in 1956. The karyotype of humans includes only 46 chromosomes. The other great apes have 48 chromosomes. Human chromosome 2 is now known to be a result of an end-to-end fusion of two ancestral ape chromosomes.

== See also ==
- Cytogenetic notation – Symbols and abbreviations used in cytogenetics
- Genome screen – Laboratory process
