= G banding =

Technique in genetics

Schematic karyogram of a human as seen on G banding, with annotated bands and sub-bands. It is a graphical representation of the idealized human diploid karyotype. Each row is vertically aligned at centromere level. It shows 22 homologous autosomal chromosome pairs, both the female (XX) and male (XY) versions of the two sex chromosomes, as well as the mitochondrial genome (at bottom left).

G-banding, G banding or Giemsa banding is a technique used in cytogenetics to produce a visible karyotype by staining condensed chromosomes. It is the most common chromosome banding method. It is useful for identifying genetic diseases (mainly chromosomal abnormalities) through the photographic representation of the entire chromosome complement.

== Method ==
The metaphase chromosomes are treated with trypsin (to partially digest the chromosome) and stained with Giemsa stain. Heterochromatic regions, which tend to be rich with adenine and thymine (AT-rich DNA) and relatively gene-poor, generally stain darkly in G-banding. In contrast, less condensed chromatin (euchromatin)—which tends to be rich with guanine and cytosine (GC-rich DNA) and more transcriptionally active—incorporates less Giemsa stain, and these regions appear as lighter bands in G-banding. The pattern of bands are numbered on each arm of the chromosome from the centromere to the telomere. This numbering system allows any band on the chromosome to be identified and described precisely. The reverse of G‑bands is obtained in R‑banding. Staining with Giemsa confers a purple color to chromosomes, but micrographs are often converted to grayscale to facilitate data presentation and make comparisons of results from different laboratories.

The less condensed the chromosomes are, the more bands appear when G-banding. This means that the different chromosomes are more distinct in prophase than they are in metaphase.

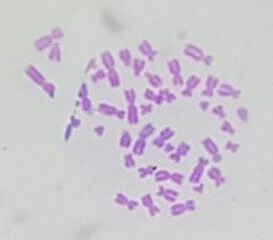
Micrograph of human male chromosomes using Giemsa staining for G banding.

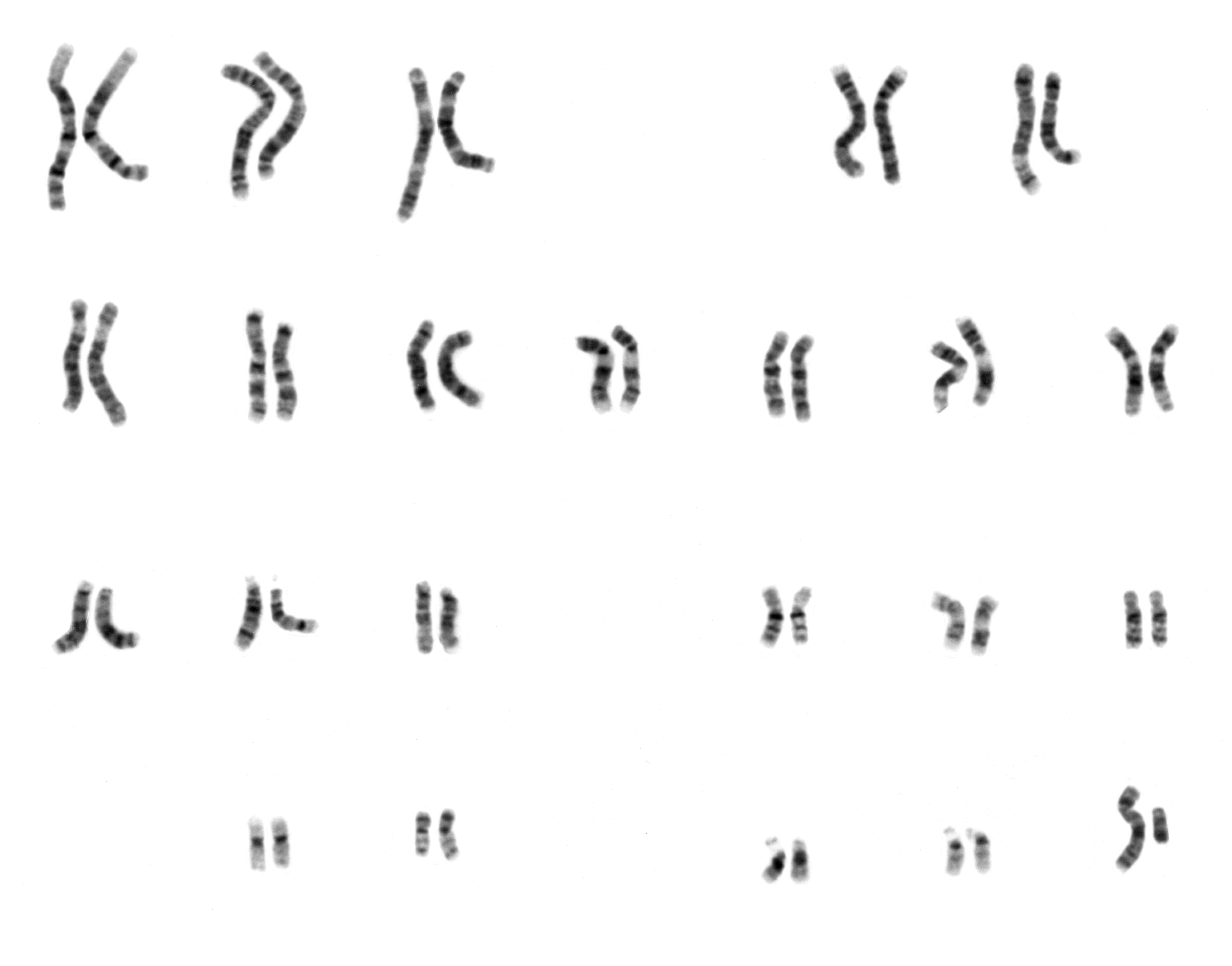
Micrograph of human male chromosomes using Giemsa stain, followed by sorting and grayscaling.

== Advantage ==
It is difficult to identify and group chromosomes based on simple staining because the uniform colour of the structures makes it difficult to differentiate between the different chromosomes. Therefore, techniques like G‑banding were developed that made "bands" appear on the chromosomes. These bands were the same in appearance on the homologous chromosomes, thus, identification became easier and more accurate.

== Types of banding ==
Other types of cytogenic banding are listed below:

Banding type	Staining method
C-banding	Constitutive heterochromatin
G-banding	Giemsa stain
Q-banding	Quinacrine
R-banding	Reverse Giemsa staining
T-banding	Telomeric

== See also ==
- Eukaryotic chromosome fine structure
- Gene mapping
- Fluorescence in situ hybridization
