= Centromere =

Specialized DNA sequence of a chromosome that links a pair of sister chromatids

In this diagram of a duplicated chromosome, (2) identifies the centromere—the region that joins the two sister chromatids, or each half of the chromosome. In prophase of mitosis, specialized regions on centromeres called kinetochores attach chromosomes to spindle fibers.

The centromere links a pair of sister chromatids together during cell division. This constricted region of chromosome connects the sister chromatids, creating a short arm (p) and a long arm (q) on the chromatids. During mitosis, spindle fibers attach to the centromere via the kinetochore.

The physical role of the centromere is to act as the site of assembly of the kinetochores – a highly complex multiprotein structure that is responsible for the actual events of chromosome segregation – i.e. binding microtubules and signaling to the cell cycle machinery when all chromosomes have adopted correct attachments to the spindle, so that it is safe for cell division to proceed to completion and for cells to enter anaphase.

There are, broadly speaking, two types of centromeres. "Point centromeres" bind to specific proteins that recognize particular DNA sequences with high efficiency. Any piece of DNA with the point centromere DNA sequence on it will typically form a centromere if present in the appropriate species. The best characterized point centromeres are those of the budding yeast, Saccharomyces cerevisiae. "Regional centromeres" is the term coined to describe most centromeres, which typically form on regions of preferred DNA sequence, but which can form on other DNA sequences as well. The signal for formation of a regional centromere appears to be epigenetic. Most organisms, ranging from the fission yeast Schizosaccharomyces pombe to humans, have regional centromeres.

Regarding mitotic chromosome structure, centromeres represent a constricted region of the chromosome (often referred to as the primary constriction) where two identical sister chromatids are most closely in contact. When cells enter mitosis, the sister chromatids (the two copies of each chromosomal DNA molecule resulting from DNA replication in chromatin form) are linked along their length by the action of the cohesin complex. It is now believed that this complex is mostly released from chromosome arms during prophase, so that by the time the chromosomes line up at the mid-plane of the mitotic spindle (also known as the metaphase plate), the last place where they are linked with one another is in the chromatin in and around the centromere.

== Position ==
Classifications of Chromosomes: I / Telocentric / Centromere placement very close to the top, p arms barely visible if visible at all.; II / Acrocentric / q arms are still much longer than the p arms, but the p arms are longer than those in telocentric.; III / Submetacentric / p and q arms are very close in length but not equal.; IV / Metacentric / p and q arms are equal in length.; A: Short arm (p arm) B: Centromere C: Long arm (q arm) D: Sister Chromatids

In humans, centromere positions define the chromosomal karyotype, in which each chromosome has two arms, p (the shorter of the two) and q (the longer). The short arm 'p' is reportedly named for the French word "petit" meaning 'small'. The position of the centromere relative to any particular linear chromosome is used to classify chromosomes as metacentric, submetacentric, acrocentric, telocentric, or holocentric.

Categorization of chromosomes according to the relative arms length
| Centromere position | Arms length ratio | Sign | Description |
|---|---|---|---|
| Medial sensu stricto | 1.0 – 1.6 | M | Metacentric |
| Medial region | 1.7 | m | Metacentric |
| Submedial | 3.0 | sm | Submetacentric |
| Subterminal | 3.1 – 6.9 | st | Subtelocentric |
| Terminal region | 7.0 | t | Acrocentric |
| Terminal sensu stricto | ∞ | T | Telocentric |
| Notes | – | Metacentric: M+m | Atelocentric: M+m+sm+st+t |

=== Metacentric ===
Metacentric means that the centromere is positioned midway between the chromosome ends, resulting in the arms being approximately equal in length. When the centromeres are metacentric, the chromosomes appear to be "x-shaped."

=== Submetacentric ===
Submetacentric means that the centromere is positioned below the middle, with one chromosome arm shorter than the other, often resulting in an L shape.

=== Acrocentric ===
An acrocentric chromosome's centromere is situated so that one of the chromosome arms is much shorter than the other. The "acro-" in acrocentric refers to the Greek word for "peak." The human genome has six acrocentric chromosomes, including five autosomal chromosomes (13, 14, 15, 21, 22) and the Y chromosome.

Short acrocentric p-arms contain little genetic material and can be translocated without significant harm, as in a balanced Robertsonian translocation. In addition to some protein coding genes, human acrocentric p-arms also contain Nucleolus organizer regions (NORs), from which ribosomal RNA is transcribed. However, a proportion of acrocentric p-arms in cell lines and tissues from normal human donors do not contain detectable NORs. The domestic horse genome includes one metacentric chromosome that is homologous to two acrocentric chromosomes in the conspecific but undomesticated Przewalski's horse. This may reflect either fixation of a balanced Robertsonian translocation in domestic horses or, conversely, fixation of the fission of one metacentric chromosome into two acrocentric chromosomes in Przewalski's horses. A similar situation exists between the human and great ape genomes, with a reduction of two acrocentric chromosomes in the great apes to one metacentric chromosome in humans (see aneuploidy and the human chromosome 2).

Many diseases from the result of unbalanced translocations more frequently involve acrocentric chromosomes than other non-acrocentric chromosomes. Acrocentric chromosomes are usually located in and around the nucleolus. As a result, these chromosomes tend to be less densely packed than chromosomes in the nuclear periphery. Consistently, chromosomal regions that are less densely packed are also more prone to chromosomal translocations in cancers.

=== Telocentric ===
Telocentric chromosomes have a centromere at one end of the chromosome and therefore exhibit only one arm at the cytological (microscopic) level. They are not present in humans but can form through cellular chromosomal errors. Telocentric chromosomes occur naturally in many species, such as the house mouse, in which all chromosomes except the Y are telocentric.

=== Subtelocentric ===
Subtelocentric chromosomes' centromeres are located between the middle and the end of the chromosomes, but reside closer to the end of the chromosomes.

== Centromere types ==
=== Acentric ===
An acentric chromosome is fragment of a chromosome that lacks a centromere. Since centromeres are the attachment point for spindle fibers in cell division, acentric fragments are not evenly distributed to daughter cells during cell division. As a result, a daughter cell will lack the acentric fragment and deleterious consequences could occur.

Chromosome-breaking events can also generate acentric chromosomes or acentric fragments.

=== Dicentric ===
A dicentric chromosome is an abnormal chromosome with two centromeres, which can be unstable through cell divisions. It can form through translocation between or fusion of two chromosome segments, each with a centromere. Some rearrangements produce both dicentric chromosomes and acentric fragments which can not attach to spindles at mitosis. The formation of dicentric chromosomes has been attributed to genetic processes, such as Robertsonian translocation and paracentric inversion. Dicentric chromosomes can have a variety of fates, including mitotic stability. In some cases, their stability comes from inactivation of one of the two centromeres to make a functionally monocentric chromosome capable of normal transmission to daughter cells during cell division.

For example, human chromosome 2, which is believed to be the result of a Robertsonian translocation at some point in the evolution between the great apes and Homo, has a second, vestigial, centromere near the middle of its long arm.

=== Monocentric ===
The monocentric chromosome is a chromosome that has only one centromere in a chromosome and forms a narrow constriction.

Monocentric centromeres are the most common structure on highly repetitive DNA in plants and animals.

=== Holocentric ===
Unlike monocentric chromosomes, holocentric chromosomes have no distinct primary constriction when viewed at mitosis. Instead, spindle fibers attach along almost the entire (Greek: holo-) length of the chromosome. In holocentric chromosomes centromeric proteins, such as CENPA (CenH3) are spread over the whole chromosome. The nematode, Caenorhabditis elegans, is a well-known example of an organism with holocentric chromosomes, but this type of centromere can be found in various species, plants, and animals, across eukaryotes. Holocentromeres are actually composed of multiple distributed centromere units that form a line-like structure along the chromosomes during mitosis. Alternative or nonconventional strategies are deployed at meiosis to achieve the homologous chromosome pairing and segregation needed to produce viable gametes or gametophytes for sexual reproduction.

Different types of holocentromeres exist in different species, namely with or without centromeric repetitive DNA sequences and with or without CenH3. Holocentricity has evolved at least 13 times independently in various green algae, protozoans, invertebrates, and different plant families. Contrary to monocentric species where acentric fragments usually become lost during cell division, the breakage of holocentric chromosomes creates fragments with normal spindle fiber attachment sites. Because of this, organisms with holocentric chromosomes can more rapidly evolve karyotype variation, able to heal fragmented chromosomes through subsequent addition of telomere caps at the sites of breakage.

=== Polycentric ===
Polycentric chromosomes have several kinetochore clusters, i.e. centromes. The term overlaps partially with "holocentric", but "polycentric" is clearly preferred when discussing defectively formed monocentric chromosomes. There is some actual ambiguity as well, as there is no clear line dividing up the transition from kinetochores covering the whole chromosome to distinct clusters. In other words, the difference between "the whole chromosome is a centrome" and "the chromosome has no centrome" is hazy and usage varies. Beyond "polycentricity" being used more about defects, there is no clear preference in other topics such as evolutionary origin or kinetochore distribution and detailed structure (e.g. as seen in tagging or genome assembly analysis).

Even clearly distinct clusters of kinetochore proteins do not necessarily produce more than one constriction: "Metapolycentric" chromosomes feature one elongated constriction of the chromosome, joining a longer segment which is still visibly shorter than the chromatids. Metapolycentric chromosomes may be a step in the emergence and suppression of centromere drive, a type of meiotic drive that disrupts parity by monocentric centromeres growing additional kinetochore proteins to gain an advantage during meiosis.

=== Human chromosomes ===
Human karyogram, with each row vertically aligned at centromere level, and with annotated bands and sub-bands. It is a graphical representation of the idealized human diploid karyotype. It shows dark and white regions on G banding. It shows both the female (XX) and male (XY) versions of the sex chromosome.

Table of human chromosomes with data on centromeres and sizes.
| Chromosome | Centromere position (Mbp) | Category | Chromosome Size (Mbp) | Centromere size (Mbp) |
|---|---|---|---|---|
| 1 | 125.0 | metacentric | 247.2 | 7.4 |
| 2 | 93.3 | submetacentric | 242.8 | 6.3 |
| 3 | 91.0 | metacentric | 199.4 | 6.0 |
| 4 | 50.4 | submetacentric | 191.3 | — |
| 5 | 48.4 | submetacentric | 180.8 | — |
| 6 | 61.0 | submetacentric | 170.9 | — |
| 7 | 59.9 | submetacentric | 158.8 | — |
| 8 | 45.6 | submetacentric | 146.3 | — |
| 9 | 49.0 | submetacentric | 140.4 | — |
| 10 | 40.2 | submetacentric | 135.4 | — |
| 11 | 53.7 | submetacentric | 134.5 | — |
| 12 | 35.8 | submetacentric | 132.3 | — |
| 13 | 17.9 | acrocentric | 114.1 | — |
| 14 | 17.6 | acrocentric | 106.3 | — |
| 15 | 19.0 | acrocentric | 100.3 | — |
| 16 | 36.6 | metacentric | 88.8 | — |
| 17 | 24.0 | submetacentric | 78.7 | — |
| 18 | 17.2 | submetacentric | 76.1 | — |
| 19 | 26.5 | metacentric | 63.8 | — |
| 20 | 27.5 | metacentric | 62.4 | — |
| 21 | 13.2 | acrocentric | 46.9 | — |
| 22 | 14.7 | acrocentric | 49.5 | — |
| X | 60.6 | submetacentric | 154.9 | — |
| Y | 12.5 | acrocentric | 57.7 | — |

Based on the micrographic characteristics of size, position of the centromere and sometimes the presence of a chromosomal satellite, the human chromosomes are classified into the following groups:

| Group | Chromosomes | Features |
|---|---|---|
| Group A | Chromosome 1–3 | Large, metacentric and submetacentric |
| Group B | Chromosome 4–5 | Large, submetacentric |
| Group C | Chromosome 6–12, X | Medium-sized, submetacentric |
| Group D | Chromosome 13–15 | Medium-sized, acrocentric, with satellite |
| Group E | Chromosome 16–18 | Small, metacentric and submetacentric |
| Group F | Chromosome 19–20 | Very small, metacentric |
| Group G | Chromosome 21–22, Y | Very small, acrocentric, with satellite |

== Sequence ==
There are two types of centromeres. In regional centromeres, DNA sequences contribute to but do not define function. Regional centromeres contain large amounts of DNA and are often packaged into heterochromatin. In most eukaryotes, the centromere's DNA sequence consists of large arrays of repetitive DNA (e.g. satellite DNA) where the sequence within individual repeat elements is similar but not identical. In humans, the primary centromeric repeat unit is called α-satellite (or alphoid), although a number of other sequence types are found in this region. Centromere satellites are hypothesized to evolve by a process called layered expansion. They evolve rapidly between species, and analyses in wild mice show that satellite copy number and heterogeneity relates to population origins and subspecies. Additionally, satellite sequences may be affected by inbreeding.

Point centromeres are smaller and more compact. DNA sequences are both necessary and sufficient to specify centromere identity and function in organisms with point centromeres. In budding yeasts, the centromere region is relatively small (about 125 bp DNA) and contains two highly conserved DNA sequences that serve as binding sites for essential kinetochore proteins.

== Inheritance ==
Since centromeric DNA sequence is not the key determinant of centromeric identity in metazoans, it is thought that epigenetic inheritance plays a major role in specifying the centromere. The daughter chromosomes will assemble centromeres in the same place as the parent chromosome, independent of sequence. It has been proposed that histone H3 variant CENP-A (Centromere Protein A) is the epigenetic mark of the centromere. The question arises whether there must be still some original way in which the centromere is specified, even if it is subsequently propagated epigenetically. If the centromere is inherited epigenetically from one generation to the next, the problem is pushed back to the origin of the first metazoans.

On the other hand, thanks to comparisons of the centromeres in the X chromosomes, epigenetic and structural variations have been seen in these regions. In addition, a recent assembly of the human genome has detected a possible mechanism of how pericentromeric and centromeric structures evolve, through a layered expansion model for αSat sequences. This model proposes that different αSat sequence repeats emerge periodically and expand within an active vector, displacing old sequences, and becoming the site of kinetochore assembly. The αSat can originate from the same, or from different vectors. As this process is repeated over time, the layers that flank the active centromere shrink and deteriorate. This process raises questions about the relationship between this dynamic evolutionary process and the position of the centromere.

== Structure ==
The centromeric DNA is normally in a heterochromatin state, which is essential for the recruitment of the cohesin complex that mediates sister chromatid cohesion after DNA replication as well as coordinating sister chromatid separation during anaphase. In this chromatin, the normal histone H3 is replaced with a centromere-specific variant, CENP-A in humans. The presence of CENP-A is believed to be important for the assembly of the kinetochore on the centromere. CENP-C has been shown to localise almost exclusively to these regions of CENP-A associated chromatin. In human cells, the histones are found to be most enriched for H4K20me3 and H3K9me3 which are known heterochromatic modifications. In Drosophila, Islands of retroelements are major components of the centromeres.

In the yeast Schizosaccharomyces pombe (and probably in other eukaryotes), the formation of centromeric heterochromatin is connected to RNAi. In nematodes such as Caenorhabditis elegans, some plants, and the insect orders Lepidoptera and Hemiptera, chromosomes are "holocentric", indicating that there is not a primary site of microtubule attachments or a primary constriction, and a "diffuse" kinetochore assembles along the entire length of the chromosome.

== Centromeric aberrations ==
In rare cases, neocentromeres can form at new sites on a chromosome as a result of a repositioning of the centromere. This phenomenon is most well known from human clinical studies and there are currently over 90 known human neocentromeres identified on 20 different chromosomes. The formation of a neocentromere must be coupled with the inactivation of the previous centromere, since chromosomes with two functional centromeres (Dicentric chromosome) will result in chromosome breakage during mitosis. In some unusual cases human neocentromeres have been observed to form spontaneously on fragmented chromosomes. Some of these new positions were originally euchromatic and lack alpha satellite DNA altogether. Neocentromeres lack the repetitive structure seen in normal centromeres which suggest that centromere formation is mainly controlled epigenetically. Over time a neocentromere can accumulate repetitive elements and mature into what is known as an evolutionary new centromere. There are several well known examples in primate chromosomes where the centromere position is different from the human centromere of the same chromosome and is thought to be evolutionary new centromeres. Centromere repositioning and the formation of evolutionary new centromeres has been suggested to be a mechanism of speciation.

Centromere proteins are also the autoantigenic target for some anti-nuclear antibodies, such as anti-centromere antibodies.

== Dysfunction and disease ==
It has been known that centromere misregulation contributes to mis-segregation of chromosomes, which is strongly related to cancer and miscarriage. Notably, overexpression of many centromere genes have been linked to cancer malignant phenotypes. Overexpression of these centromere genes can increase genomic instability in cancers. Elevated genomic instability on one hand relates to malignant phenotypes; on the other hand, it makes the tumor cells more vulnerable to specific adjuvant therapies such as certain chemotherapies and radiotherapy. Instability of centromere repetitive DNA was recently shown in cancer and aging.

== Repair of centromeric DNA ==
When DNA breaks occur at centromeres in the G1 phase of the cell cycle, the cells are able to recruit the homologous recombinational repair machinery to the damaged site, even in the absence of a sister chromatids. It appears that homologous recombinational repair can occur at centromeric breaks throughout the cell cycle in order to prevent the activation of inaccurate mutagenic DNA repair pathways and to preserve centromeric integrity.

== Etymology and pronunciation ==
The word centromere (/ˈsɛntrəˌmɪər/) uses combining forms of centro- and -mere, yielding "central part", describing the centromere's location at the center of the chromosome.

== See also ==
- Telomere
- Chromatid
- Diploid
- Monopolin
