= List of Chironomus species =

These 463 species belong to Chironomus, a genus of non-biting midges in the family Chironomidae.

== Chironomus species ==
- Chironomus aberratus Keyl, 1961
- Chironomus abjectus Kieffer, 1917
- Chironomus absconditus Kieffer, 1926
- Chironomus acerbiphilus Tokunaga, 1939
- Chironomus acerbus Hirvenoja, 1962
- Chironomus acidophilus Keyl, 1960
- Chironomus acuminatus Freeman, 1957
- Chironomus acutiventris Wülker & Ryser, 1983
- Chironomus acutus Das, Majumdar, Mazumdar & Hazra, 2015
- Chironomus aegyptius (Kieffer, 1913)
- Chironomus affinis Wiedemann, 1817
- Chironomus agilis Shobanov & Djomin, 1988
- Chironomus albimaculatus Shobanov, Wülker & Kiknadze, 2002
- Chironomus albomarginatus Kieffer, 1924
- Chironomus alchichica Acosta & Prat, 2017
- Chironomus alluaudi Kieffer, 1913
- Chironomus alpestris Goetghebuer, 1934
- Chironomus alternans Walker, 1856
- Chironomus alternus Das, Majumdar, Mazumdar & Hazra, 2015
- Chironomus amissum Correia, Trivinho-Strixino & Michailova, 2013
- Chironomus analis Freeman, 1959
- Chironomus anchialicus Mikhailova, 1974
- Chironomus androgyne Kieffer, 1918
- Chironomus angustatus Thienemann & Kieffer, 1916
- Chironomus annularius Meigen, 1818
- Chironomus anonymus Williston, 1896
- Chironomus antarcticus Walker, 1836
- Chironomus antennalis Kieffer, 1917
- Chironomus anthracinus Zetterstedt, 1860
- Chironomus antipodensis Sublette & Wirth, 1980
- Chironomus antiramus Kieffer, 1925
- Chironomus antonioi Correia & Trivinho-Strixino, 2007
- Chironomus apicalis Kieffer, 1908
- Chironomus apicatus Johannsen, 1932
- Chironomus aprilinus Meigen, 1830
- Chironomus arcuatus Kieffer, 1917
- Chironomus arcustylus Siirin, 2003
- Chironomus ashei Murray & O'Connor, 2025
- Chironomus athalassicus Cannings, 1975
- Chironomus atrella (Townes, 1945)
- Chironomus atripennis Rempel, 1939
- Chironomus atritibia Malloch, 1934
- Chironomus atrolineatus Goetghebuer, 1928
- Chironomus atroviridis (Townes, 1945)
- Chironomus attenuatus Walker, 1848
- Chironomus australis Macquart, 1847
- Chironomus balatonicus Dévai, Wülker & Scholl, 1983
- Chironomus balticus (Kieffer, 1925)
- Chironomus bavaricus Wülker & Ryser, 1983
- Chironomus behningi Goetghebuer, 1928
- Chironomus beljaninae Wülker, 1991
- Chironomus bernensis Wülker & Klötzli, 1973
- Chironomus bethsaidae (Kieffer, 1915)
- Chironomus bharati Singh & Kulshrestha, 1976
- Chironomus bicolor Waltl, 1837
- Chironomus bicoloris Tokunaga, 1964
- Chironomus bicornutus (Kieffer, 1913)
- Chironomus bifidus Pal & Hazra, 2017
- Chironomus bifurcatus Wuelker, Martin, Kiknadze, Sublette & Michiels, 2009
- Chironomus bimacula Walker, 1848
- Chironomus bincus Kieffer, 1924
- Chironomus binodulus Kieffer, 1922
- Chironomus bipunctus Johannsen, 1932
- Chironomus biseta (Townes, 1945)
- Chironomus biwaprimus (Sasa & Kawai, 1987)
- Chironomus blaylocki Wuelker, Martin, Kiknadze, Sublette & Michiels, 2009
- Chironomus boliviensis Kieffer, 1917
- Chironomus bonaerensis Lynch Arribálzaga, 1881
- Chironomus bonus Shilova, 1974
- Chironomus borealis Curtis, 1835
- Chironomus borokensis Kerkis, Filippova & Shobanov, 1988
- Chironomus boydi
- Chironomus breviantennatus Konstantinov, 1956
- Chironomus brevibarba Kieffer, 1922
- Chironomus brevidentatus Hirvenoja & Mikhailova, 1998
- Chironomus brevipalpis (Kieffer, 1926)
- Chironomus brevisetis Shilova, 1989
- Chironomus brevistylus Guha & Chaudhuri, 1985
- Chironomus brunneipennis Johannsen, 1905
- Chironomus brunneus Freeman, 1954
- Chironomus caffrarius Kieffer, 1914
- Chironomus calipterus Kieffer, 1908
- Chironomus calligraphus Goeldi, 1905
- Chironomus carolinensis Tokunaga, 1964
- Chironomus cavazzi Kieffer, 1913
- Chironomus chelonia (Townes, 1945)
- Chironomus chlorogaster Kieffer, 1911
- Chironomus chlorophilus Weyenbergh, 1886
- Chironomus cingulatus Meigen, 1830
- Chironomus circumdatus (Kieffer, 1916)
- Chironomus citrinellus (Kieffer, 1913)
- Chironomus claggi Tokunaga, 1964
- Chironomus clarinervis (Kieffer, 1924)
- Chironomus clarus Hirvenoja, 1962
- Chironomus clavipenis Das, Majumdar, Mazumdar & Hazra, 2015
- Chironomus cloacalis Atchley & Martin, 1971
- Chironomus coaetaneus Hirvenoja, 1998
- Chironomus columbiensis Wülker, Sublette, Morath & Martin, 1989
- Chironomus commutatus Keyl, 1960
- Chironomus confectus Das, Majumdar, Mazumdar & Hazra, 2015
- Chironomus congolensis Goetghebuer, 1936
- Chironomus coracellus Kieffer, 1922
- Chironomus corax (Kieffer, 1911)
- Chironomus cordovensis Weyenbergh, 1886
- Chironomus corniger Goetghebuer, 1921
- Chironomus costatus Johannsen, 1932
- Chironomus crassicaudatus Malloch, 1915
- Chironomus crassicaudus Tokunaga, 1964
- Chironomus crassicornis (Kieffer, 1922)
- Chironomus crassiforceps (Kieffer, 1916)
- Chironomus crassimanus Strenzke, 1959
- Chironomus cucini Webb, 1969
- Chironomus culterus Das, Majumdar, Mazumdar & Hazra, 2015
- Chironomus curabilis Belyanina, Sigareva & Loginova, 1990
- Chironomus curtipalpis Kieffer, 1917
- Chironomus dahlbomi Zetterstedt, 1860
- Chironomus daitodeeus Sasa & Suzuki, 2001
- Chironomus daitofegea Sasa & Suzuki, 2001
- Chironomus decksbachi Goetghebuer, 1930
- Chironomus decorus Johannsen, 1905
- Chironomus decumbens Malloch, 1934
- Chironomus dendrophila (Zvereva, 1950)
- Chironomus despectus Kieffer, 1917
- Chironomus detriticola Correia & Trivinho-Strixino, 2007
- Chironomus diakonoffi (Kruseman, 1949)
- Chironomus dilutus Shobanov, Kiknadze & Butler, 1999
- Chironomus discolor (Santos Abreu, 1918)
- Chironomus distans Kieffer, 1909
- Chironomus dolichotomus Kieffer, 1911
- Chironomus dorsalis Meigen, 1818
- Chironomus duplex Walker, 1856
- Chironomus dystenus (Kieffer, 1916)
- Chironomus echizensis Sasa, 1994
- Chironomus elatior Kieffer, 1916
- Chironomus ellejorsava Murray & O'connor, 2025
- Chironomus enshiensis Wang, 1994
- Chironomus enteromorphae Tokunaga, 1936
- Chironomus entis Shobanov, 1989
- Chironomus equisitus
- Chironomus esai Wülker, 1997
- Chironomus excavatus Kieffer, 1917
- Chironomus excisus Kieffer, 1917
- Chironomus famiabeus Sasa, 1996
- Chironomus filimanus Kieffer, 1918
- Chironomus fittkaui Correia & Trivinho-Strixino, 2007
- Chironomus flaveolus Meigen, 1818
- Chironomus flavicollis Meigen, 1818
- Chironomus flavitibia Johannsen, 1932
- Chironomus flavofasciatus Kieffer, 1918
- Chironomus flavoviridis Lundstrom, 1915
- Chironomus fluminicola Weyenbergh, 1886
- Chironomus formosae (Kieffer, 1912)
- Chironomus formosipennis Kieffer, 1908
- Chironomus forsythi Martin, 1999
- Chironomus fortibracchius Das, Majumdar, Mazumdar & Hazra, 2015
- Chironomus fortistylus Chaudhuri, Das & Sublette, 1992
- Chironomus fraternus Wülker, 1991
- Chironomus frequentatus Belyanina & Filinkova, 1996
- Chironomus frisianus (Kieffer, 1912)
- Chironomus frommeri Atchley & Martin, 1971
- Chironomus fujitertius Sasa, 1985
- Chironomus fulviventris (Kieffer, 1921)
- Chironomus fundatus Philinkova & Belyanina, 1993
- Chironomus fusciceps Yamamoto, 1990
- Chironomus galilaeus (Kieffer, 1915)
- Chironomus gelhausi Bouchard, 2022
- Chironomus gigas Reiss, 1974
- Chironomus ginzanabeus Sasa & Suzuki, 2001
- Chironomus globulus Filinkova & Belyanina, 1993
- Chironomus grandivalva (Shilova, 1957)
- Chironomus grisescens Goetghebuer, 1921
- Chironomus gualtemaltecus Cockerell, 1915
- Chironomus halophilus Packard, 1873
- Chironomus hamatus Freeman, 1957
- Chironomus harpi Sublette, 1991
- Chironomus harti Malloch, 1915
- Chironomus harunaprimus Sasa, 1996
- Chironomus hawaiiensis Grimshaw, 1901
- Chironomus hemicyclius Das, Majumdar, Mazumdar & Hazra, 2015
- Chironomus heterodentatus Konstantinov, 1956
- Chironomus heteropilicornis Wülker, 1996
- Chironomus hirtimanus Kieffer & Thienemann, 1908
- Chironomus hirtitarsis Johannsen, 1932
- Chironomus holomelas Keyl, 1961
- Chironomus holsatus (Lenz)
- Chironomus horni Kieffer, 1918
- Chironomus hungaricus (Szitó, 1969)
- Chironomus hyperboreus Staeger, 1845
- Chironomus ignotus Zavřel, 1932
- Chironomus imberbis Kieffer, 1917
- Chironomus imicola Kieffer, 1913
- Chironomus improvidus Hirvenoja, 1998
- Chironomus improvisus Shobanov, 2004
- Chironomus incertipenis Chaudhuri, 1996
- Chironomus incertus (Kieffer, 1924)
- Chironomus inermifrons Goetghebuer, 1921
- Chironomus inquinatus Correia, Trivinho-Strixino & Mikhailova, 2006
- Chironomus islandicus (Kieffer, 1913)
- Chironomus jamaicensis Gerry, 1933
- Chironomus jangchunensis Ree, 2012
- Chironomus januarius Skuse, 1889
- Chironomus javanus Kieffer, 1924
- Chironomus joni Spies & Reiss, 1996
- Chironomus jonmartini Lindeberg, 1979
- Chironomus kagaensis Sasa, 1994
- Chironomus kanazawai (Yamamoto, 1996)
- Chironomus kiiensis Tokunaga, 1936
- Chironomus kiknadzeae Mikhailova, 1984
- Chironomus komensis (Zvereva, 1950)
- Chironomus lacunarius Wülker & Klötzli, 1973
- Chironomus lacustris (Kieffer, 1913)
- Chironomus lasiopus Walker, 1848
- Chironomus latistylus Reiss, 1974
- Chironomus latusus Jiang & Wang, 2011
- Chironomus lenzi Kieffer, 1922
- Chironomus leucochlorus Kieffer, 1923
- Chironomus leucopterus Linevich, 1971
- Chironomus linearis Kieffer, 1911
- Chironomus longiforceps Kieffer, 1918
- Chironomus longilobus (Kieffer, 1916)
- Chironomus longistylus Goetghebuer, 1921
- Chironomus longivalvis Kieffer, 1910
- Chironomus loricatus Kieffer, 1917
- Chironomus lugubris Zetterstedt, 1850
- Chironomus lundstroemi Saether, 2004
- Chironomus luridus Strenzke, 1959
- Chironomus lurilatus Das, Majumdar, Mazumdar & Hazra, 2015
- Chironomus macani Freeman, 1948
- Chironomus macrogaster Kieffer, 1911
- Chironomus maddeni Martin & Cranston, 1995
- Chironomus maerens Sherborn, 1928
- Chironomus major Wülker & Butler, 1983
- Chironomus markosjani Shilova, 1983
- Chironomus maturus Johannsen, 1908
- Chironomus mayri Mazumdar, Mazumdar & Chaudhuri, 2009
- Chironomus meinerii Kieffer, 1915
- Chironomus melanderi Kieffer, 1917
- Chironomus melanescens Keyl, 1961
- Chironomus melanopus Kieffer, 1916
- Chironomus melanotus Keyl, 1961
- Chironomus mongolabeus (Sasa & Suzuki, 1997)
- Chironomus mongolbeceus (Sasa & Suzuki, 1997)
- Chironomus mongolcedeus Sasa & Suzuki, 1997
- Chironomus mongoldeeus Sasa & Suzuki, 1997
- Chironomus mongolefeus Sasa & Suzuki, 1997
- Chironomus mongolfegeus Sasa & Suzuki, 1997
- Chironomus mongolgeheus Sasa & Suzuki, 1997
- Chironomus mongolheius Sasa & Suzuki, 1997
- Chironomus montuosus Ryser, Wülker & Scholl, 1985
- Chironomus mozleyi Wülker, 2007
- Chironomus muratensis Ryser & Scholl, 1983
- Chironomus neocorax Wülker & Butler, 1983
- Chironomus neofulvus Rempel, 1939
- Chironomus nepalensis (Kieffer, 1911)
- Chironomus nepeanensis Skuse, 1889
- Chironomus niger Chaudhuri, Das & Sublette, 1992
- Chironomus nigerilateralis Tokunaga, 1964
- Chironomus nigricans Goetghebuer, 1927
- Chironomus nigrifrons Linevich, 1971
- Chironomus nigritibia Walker, 1848
- Chironomus nigrocaudata Erbaeva, 1968
- Chironomus nigroviridis Macquart, 1834
- Chironomus nippodorsalis Sasa, 1979
- Chironomus nipponensis Tokunaga, 1940
- Chironomus nipponicus Tokunaga, 1940
- Chironomus nitidiventris Edwards, 1931
- Chironomus nivalis Freeman, 1954
- Chironomus noctivagus (Kieffer, 1911)
- Chironomus noctuabundus Kieffer, 1911
- Chironomus nocturnalis Kieffer, 1911
- Chironomus novaeguineensis Meijere, 1906
- Chironomus novosibiricus Kiknadze, Siirin & Kerkis, 1993
- Chironomus nuditarsis Keyl, 1961
- Chironomus nudiventris Ryser & Scholl, 1983
- Chironomus obensis Filinkova & Belyanina, 1996
- Chironomus obscuripes Holmgren, 1869
- Chironomus obscurus (Filinkova & Belyanina, 1994)
- Chironomus obtusidens Goetghebuer, 1921
- Chironomus occidentalis Skuse, 1889
- Chironomus ochreatus (Townes, 1945)
- Chironomus ochrocoma Kieffer, 1922
- Chironomus oculatus Shobanov, 1996
- Chironomus okinawanus Hasegawa & Sasa, 1987
- Chironomus okisiroia (Sasa, 1993)
- Chironomus oliveirai Correia & Trivinho-Strixino, 2007
- Chironomus oppositus Walker, 1856
- Chironomus ovazzai Freeman, 1957
- Chironomus pacificus Tokunaga, 1936
- Chironomus palidus Linevich, 1971
- Chironomus pallidiramus Kieffer, 1925
- Chironomus pallidivittatus Malloch, 1915
- Chironomus palpalis Johannsen, 1932
- Chironomus pankratovi Grebenyuk, Kiknadze & Belyanina, 1989
- Chironomus paraalbidus Polukonova, Belyanina & Zinchenko, 2005
- Chironomus paragigas Reiss, 1974
- Chironomus parariparius Martin, 2023
- Chironomus parathummi Keyl, 1961
- Chironomus parvulus (Santos Abreu, 1918)
- Chironomus paulfreemani Säwedal, 1981
- Chironomus pectoralis Kieffer, 1917
- Chironomus perangustatus Goetghebuer, 1952
- Chironomus percurrens Kieffer, 1909
- Chironomus peringueyi Kieffer, 1923
- Chironomus pervagatus Skuse, 1889
- Chironomus petiolatus Kieffer, 1917
- Chironomus phytophilus Correia & Trivinho-Strixino, 2007
- Chironomus piger Strenzke, 1959
- Chironomus pilicornis (Fabricius, 1787)
- Chironomus ploenesis (Kieffer, 1922)
- Chironomus plumatisetigerus Tokunaga, 1964
- Chironomus plumosulus Golubeva, 1987
- Chironomus plumosus (Linnaeus, 1758) (buzzer midge)
- Chironomus polaris Kirby, 1824
- Chironomus polonicus
- Chironomus praeapicalis Tokunaga, 1964
- Chironomus prasinellus (Kieffer, 1912)
- Chironomus prasinus Meigen, 1804
- Chironomus prior Butler, 1982
- Chironomus pseudofasciatus Gerry, 1932
- Chironomus pseudomendax Wülker, 1999
- Chironomus pseudothummi Strenzke, 1959
- Chironomus pseudovulpes (Kruseman, 1933)
- Chironomus pulcher Wiedemann, 1830
- Chironomus quadratus Johannsen, 1932
- Chironomus quinnitukqut Martin, Sublette & Caldwell, 2010
- Chironomus ramosus Chaudhuri, Das & Sublette, 1992
- Chironomus rectilobus Kieffer, 1921
- Chironomus redeuns Walker
- Chironomus reductus (Lenz, 1924)
- Chironomus reissi Correia, Trivinho-Strixino & Mikhailova, 2005
- Chironomus reservatus Shobanov, 1997
- Chironomus restrictus Kieffer, 1922
- Chironomus riihimakiensis Wülker, 1973
- Chironomus rincon Sublette & Sasa, 1994
- Chironomus riparius Meigen, 1804
- Chironomus rishii Trivinho-Strixino & Silva, 2018
- Chironomus rusticus Meigen, 1835
- Chironomus salinarius Kieffer, 1915
- Chironomus samoensis Edwards, 1928
- Chironomus sanctipaula Sublette, 1966
- Chironomus satchelli Freeman, 1957
- Chironomus sauteri Kieffer, 1921
- Chironomus sauterianus Kieffer, 1921
- Chironomus saxatilis Wülker, 1981
- Chironomus saxonicus Lenz, 1921
- Chironomus scotti Kieffer, 1911
- Chironomus scriptus Waltl, 1837
- Chironomus semireductus Lenz, 1924
- Chironomus senisetosus Jiang & Wang, 2011
- Chironomus setivalva (Shilova, 1957)
- Chironomus setonis Tokunaga, 1936
- Chironomus seychelleanus Kieffer, 1911
- Chironomus seydeli Goetghebuer, 1936
- Chironomus sieberti Kieffer, 1921
- Chironomus sinicus Kiknadze & Wang, 2005
- Chironomus sinuosus Guha & Chaudhuri, 1984
- Chironomus sokolovae Istomina, Kiknadze & Siirin, 1999
- Chironomus solicitus Hirvenoja, 1962
- Chironomus solitus Linevich, 1971
- Chironomus sordidatus Kieffer, 1913
- Chironomus sororius Wülker, 1973
- Chironomus staegeri Lundbeck, 1898
- Chironomus stigmaterus Say, 1823
- Chironomus storai Goetghebuer, 1937
- Chironomus strenzkei Fittkau, 1968
- Chironomus striatus Strenzke, 1959
- Chironomus stricticornis (Kieffer, 1911)
- Chironomus subantarcticus Sublette & Wirth, 1980
- Chironomus subdolus Skuse, 1889
- Chironomus subrectus Kieffer, 1922
- Chironomus subreductus Zavřel, 1932
- Chironomus subviridis Kieffer, 1918
- Chironomus sulfurosus Yamamoto, 1990
- Chironomus surfurosus Yamamoto, 1990
- Chironomus suwai Golygina & Martin, 2003
- Chironomus tardus Butler, 1982
- Chironomus tentans Fabricius, 1805
- Chironomus tenuicaudatus Goetghebuer, 1950
- Chironomus tenuistylus Brundin, 1949
- Chironomus tenuiventris Kieffer, 1917
- Chironomus tepperi Skuse, 1889
- Chironomus tetraleucus Kieffer, 1914
- Chironomus trabicola Shobanov, Wülker & Kiknadze, 2002
- Chironomus transvaalensis Kieffer, 1923
- Chironomus trichomerus Walker, 1848
- Chironomus trifilis Kieffer, 1915
- Chironomus trilobatus Rempel, 1939
- Chironomus trimaculatus Macquart, 1838
- Chironomus trinigrivittatus Tokunaga, 1940
- Chironomus triseta Thienemann & Kieffer, 1916
- Chironomus tschubarevae Belyanina & Filinkova, 2020
- Chironomus tuberculatus (Townes, 1945)
- Chironomus turfaceus Kieffer, 1929
- Chironomus tusimaabeus Sasa & Suzuki, 1999
- Chironomus tuvanicus Kiknadze, Siirin & Wülker, 1993
- Chironomus tuxis Curran, 1930
- Chironomus usenicus Loginova & Belyanina, 1994
- Chironomus utahensis Malloch, 1915
- Chironomus uttarpadeshensis Singh & Kulshrestha, 1976
- Chironomus validus (Kieffer, 1912)
- Chironomus valkanovi Mikhailova, 1974
- Chironomus vallenduuki Ashe & O'Connor, 2014
- Chironomus vancouveri Mikhailova & Fischer, 1986
- Chironomus virdicollis Wulp, 1858
- Chironomus virens (Linnaeus, 1767)
- Chironomus viridellus Kieffer, 1918
- Chironomus viridipes Macquart, 1826
- Chironomus vittiventris Edwards, 1931
- Chironomus vockerothi Rasmussen, 1984
- Chironomus vulpes Kieffer, 1924
- Chironomus whitseli Sublette & Sublette, 1974
- Chironomus willistoni Johannsen, 1905
- Chironomus winnelli Wülker, 2007
- Chironomus winthemi Goetghebuer, 1931
- Chironomus wuelkeri Sublette & Sasa, 1994
- Chironomus wulkeri Philinkova & Belyanina, 1993
- Chironomus xanthus Rempel, 1939
- Chironomus yoshimatsui Martin & Sublette, 1972
- Chironomus zavreli Kieffer, 1922
- Chironomus zealandicus Hudson, 1892
- Chironomus zernyi Goetghebuer, 1931
- † Chironomus abietarius Meunier, 1904
- † Chironomus almelanderi Arnaud, 1966
- † Chironomus aquisextanus Théobald, 1937
- † Chironomus asepultus Arnaud, 1966
- † Chironomus bituminosus Heyden, 1870
- † Chironomus brevirostris Giebel, 1856
- † Chironomus caliginosus Meunier, 1904
- † Chironomus depletus Scudder, 1877
- † Chironomus elegantulus Meunier, 1904
- † Chironomus gaudini Heer, 1864
- † Chironomus haustus Meunier, 1912
- † Chironomus inclusus Meunier, 1912
- † Chironomus inglorius Meunier, 1904
- † Chironomus kirklandi Sublette, 1969
- † Chironomus lacunus Meunier, 1904
- † Chironomus lacus Meunier, 1904
- † Chironomus meticulosus Meunier, 1904
- † Chironomus meunieri Arnaud, 1966
- † Chironomus meyeri Heer, 1849
- † Chironomus microcephalus Giebel, 1856
- † Chironomus obsoletus Heer, 1849
- † Chironomus obtusus Meunier, 1899
- † Chironomus oeningensis Heer, 1849
- † Chironomus paludosus Meunier, 1904
- † Chironomus pauludosus Meunier, 1904
- † Chironomus pausatus Melander, 1949
- † Chironomus pliocenicus Piton, 1935
- † Chironomus primaevus Melander, 1949
- † Chironomus pristinus Melander, 1949
- † Chironomus proterus Melander, 1949
- † Chironomus requiescens Melander, 1949
- † Chironomus scudderiellus Cockerell, 1916
- † Chironomus sepultus Heer, 1849
- † Chironomus serresi Théobald, 1937
- † Chironomus subobscurus Meunier, 1904
- † Chironomus tenebricosus Meunier, 1904
- † Chironomus tenebrosus Meunier, 1904
- † Chironomus uliginosus Meunier, 1904
- † Chironomus umbraticus Meunier, 1904
- † Chironomus umbrosus Meunier, 1904
- † Chironomus vagabundus Meunier, 1904
- † Chironomus venerabilis Etheridge & Olliff, 1890
