= H. G. Callan =

English zoologist and cytologist

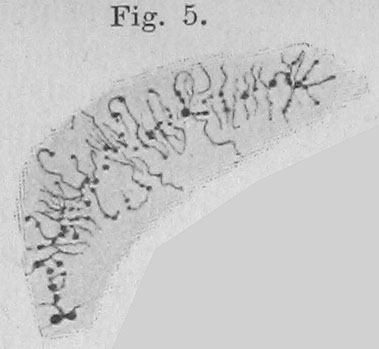
Lampbrush chromosome from the cell nucleus of an ovarial egg from Triton sp., a salamander.

Harold Garnet Callan FRS FRSE (15 March 1917, in Maidenhead – 3 November 1993), known as Mick Callan, was an English zoologist and cytologist. He is especially remembered for his work on Lampbrush chromosomes.

== Life ==
Callan was born in Maidenhead in Berkshire the son of Garnet George Callan, a naval architect, and Winifred Edith Brazier, a teacher.

He was educated at King's College School in Wimbledon, and then won a place at St John's College at Oxford University graduating with a First Class MA in Zoology in 1938.

After initially finding employment at the John Innes Institute in Surrey, he won a scholarship and jumped at the chance of working at the Stazione Zoologica in Naples. This was initially to study sex hormones of the octopus. It was here that he first saw Lampbrush chromosomes, which became his lifetime obsession.

His studies in Naples were interrupted by the Second World War. Mick initially joined the RAF, rising from Flight Lieutenant to Squadron Leader, as a highly competent airman. He was then transferred into radar research and operation.

After the war, then newly married, he moved to work at University College, London, and from there to Edinburgh to work under the famed biologist Conrad Hal Waddington. Here he worked in the Research Unit of Animal Genetics from 1946 to 1950. In 1950, Callan gained a D.Sc. from the University of Edinburgh. He then received a professorship (the Kennedy Chair in Natural History) at St Andrews University, replacing Prof D'Arcy Wentworth Thompson, and stayed in this role from 1950 to 1982.

He was elected a Fellow of the Royal Society of Edinburgh in 1952 and a Fellow of the Royal Society in 1963. St Andrews University awarded him an honorary doctorate (DSc) in 1984.

He served as a Trustee of the British Museum from 1963 to 1966.

In 1981, Callan became a founding member of the World Cultural Council.

He promoted scientific advancement within the Soviet Bloc, travelling three times to Russia and once to China, in the interests of scientific advancement.

His final (post-retiral) research was spent largely with Dr Joe Gall in Baltimore, working on snurposomes and RNA-packaging.

He died at home, Feuchside near Dundee, on 3 November 1993.

== Family ==
Mick met his wife, Amarillis Maria Speranza Dohrn in Naples and they married there in 1944. They had one son and two daughters.

== Publications ==
- Chromosomes and Nucleoli of the Axolotl, Ambystoma Mexicanum. In: J Cell Sci 1, 1966: 85–108. PDF
- Lampbrush Chromosomes (1986)
