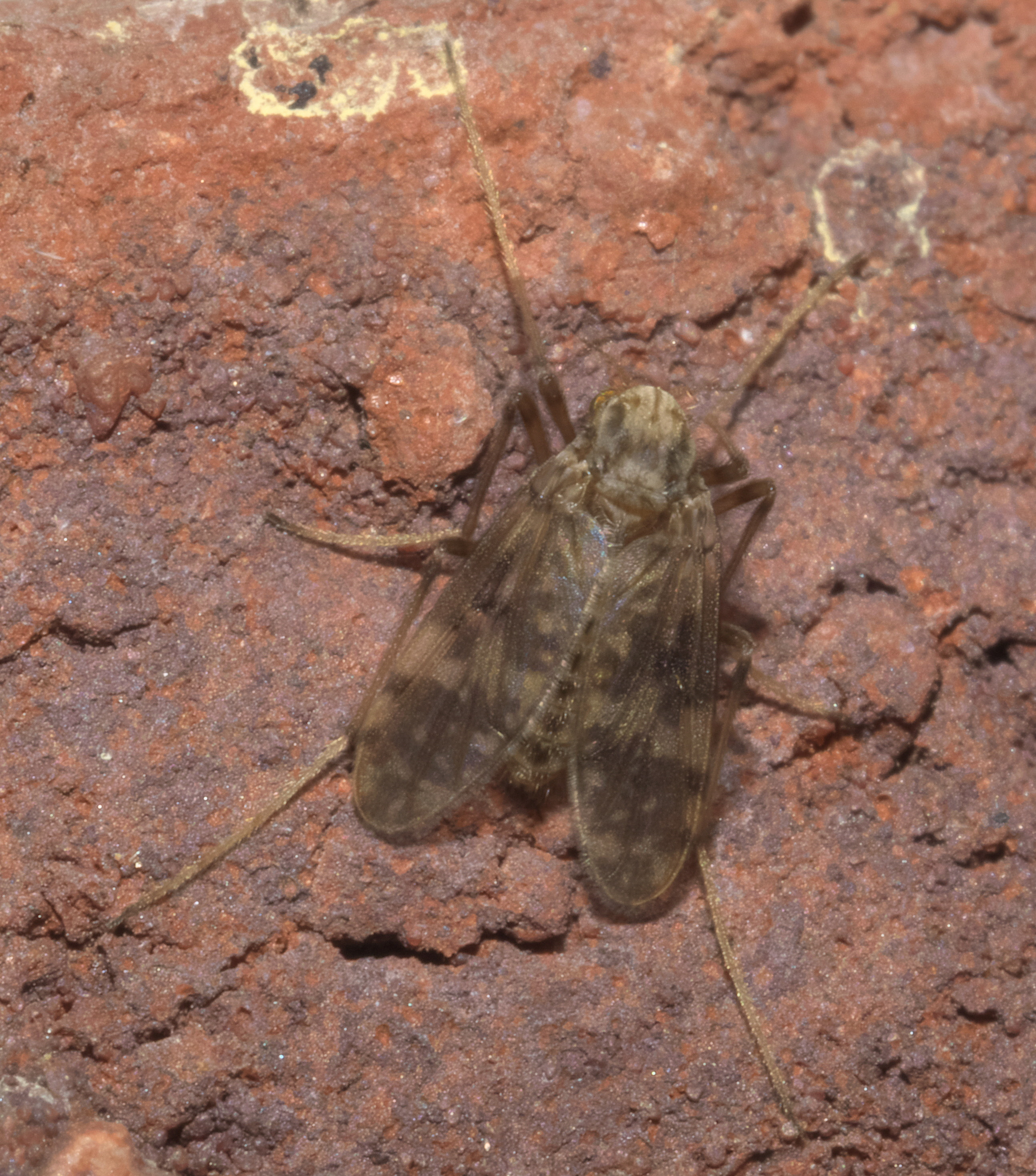
- Psectrotanypus dyari

Scientific classification
- Kingdom: Animalia
- Phylum: Arthropoda
- Class: Insecta
- Order: Diptera
- Family: Chironomidae
- Subfamily: Tanypodinae
- Tribe: Macropelopiini
- Genus: Psectrotanypus; Kieffer, 1909

= Psectrotanypus =

Genus of flies

Psectrotanypus is a genus of non-biting midges in the subfamily Tanypodinae of the bloodworm family Chironomidae. Psectrotanypus varius (Fabricius, 1787) is known to occur in very polluted waters with only few other accompanying species such as Chironomus plumosus.

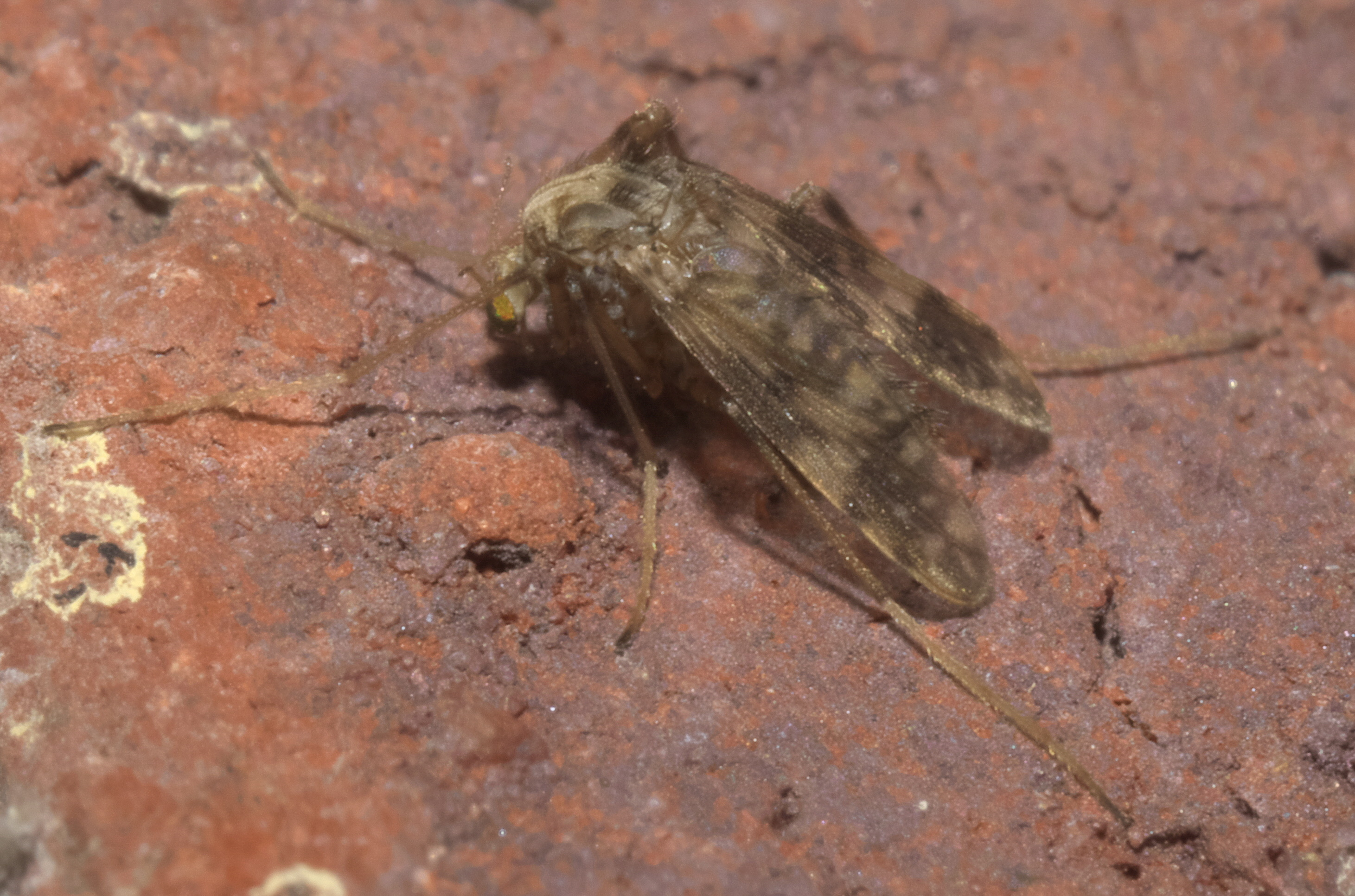
Psectrotanypus dyari

== Species ==
These 15 species belong to the genus Psectrotanypus:

- Psectrotanypus aclines Sublette, 1964^{i c g}
- Psectrotanypus alaskensis (Malloch, 1919)^{i c g}
- Psectrotanypus brevicornis Kieffer, 1923^{c g}
- Psectrotanypus discolor Coquillett^{i c g}
- Psectrotanypus dyari (Coquillett, 1902)^{i c g b}
- Psectrotanypus johnsoni (Coquillett)^{i}
- Psectrotanypus lateralis Cheng & Wang, 2006^{c g}
- Psectrotanypus orientalis Fittkau^{g}
- Psectrotanypus pictipennis (Zetterstedt, 1838)^{i c}
- Psectrotanypus schwetzi (Freeman, 1955)^{c g}
- Psectrotanypus sibiricus Kruglova & Chernovskij, 1940^{c g}
- Psectrotanypus strigilifer (Kieffer, 1921)^{c g}
- Psectrotanypus varius (Fabricius, 1787)^{g}
- Psectrotanypus venustus (Coquillett)^{i}
- Psectrotanypus virdescens (Goetghebuer, 1922)^{c g}

Data sources: i = ITIS, c = Catalogue of Life, g = GBIF, b = Bugguide.net
