= Apsectrotanypus johnsoni =

Scientific classification
- Kingdom: Animalia
- Phylum: Arthropoda
- Class: Insecta
- Order: Diptera
- Family: Chironomidae
- Tribe: Macropelopiini
- Genus: Apsectrotanypus
- Species: A. johnsoni

Binomial name
- Apsectrotanypus johnsoni (Coquillett, 1901)

Synonyms
- Tanypus johnsoni Coquillett, 1901

Species of fly

Apsectrotanypus johnsoni is a species of midge in the family Chironomidae.
