= Édouard-Gérard Balbiani =

French embryologist

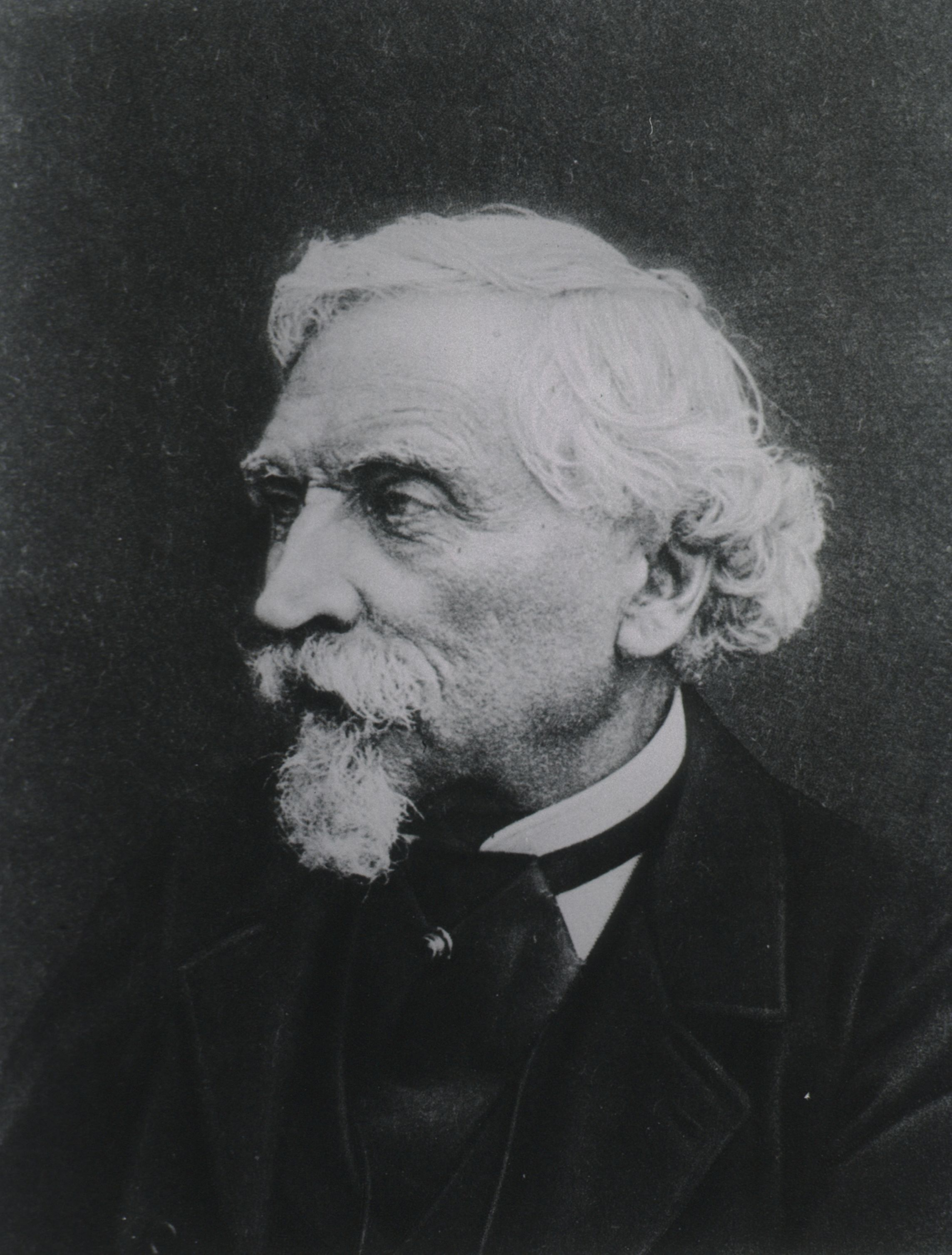
- Born: 31 July 1823; Port-au-Prince, Haiti
- Died: 25 July 1899 (aged 75); Meudon, Hauts-de-Seine, France
- Known for: The general theory of the autonomy of the germ cell
- Children: 1
- Relatives: Alfred Binet (son-in-law)
- Scientific career
- Fields: Embryology, microbiology
- Workplaces: Collège de France
- Academic advisors: Henri Marie Ducrotay de Blainville
- Doctoral students: Alfred Binet

Édouard-Gérard Balbiani (July 31, 1823 – July 25, 1899) was a French embryologist born in Port-au-Prince, Haiti.

He was educated in Frankfurt and Paris. In Paris he studied natural sciences under zoologist Henri Marie Ducrotay de Blainville (1777–1850). In 1874 he became professor of embryogeny at the Collège de France, where he remained until his death in 1899.

Balbiani is known for his work in microbiology as well as his studies in embryology. He is credited with the discovery of sexual organ development in Chironomus which eventually led to the general theory on the autonomy of the germ cell. Also, he conducted comprehensive biological research on the sexual habits of Phylloxera vastatrix. With anatomist Louis-Antoine Ranvier (1835–1922), he founded the Archives d'anatomie microscopique.

In 1884, his daughter Laure Balbiani married psychologist Alfred Binet.

== Associated eponyms ==
- "Balbiani body": cytoplasmatic structure, containing a "cloud" or grouping of mitochondria, that form in early oocytes.
- "Balbiani ring": a large chromosome puff, where high levels of transcription occur.

== Selected publications ==
- Sur la structure du noyau des cellules salivaires chez les larves de Chironomus. Balbiani, E.G. Zool. Anz. 4: 637–641,662-666
- Le phylloxera du chêne et le phylloxera de la vigne (1884)
- Leçons sur les sporozoaires (1884)
- Rapport sur les insectes utiles (1881)
- Recherches sur les phénomènes sexuels des infusoires (1861)
- La sériciculture nouvelle (1881)
- Mémoire sur la reproduction du phylloxéra du chêne (1874)
- Sur la Structure et la division du noyau chez le "Spirochona gemmipara (1895)
