= Micropia =

Micropia is the name of a family of LTR retrotransposons widespread in the genomes of fruitflies of the genus Drosophila. Micropia retrotransposons in some species of Drosophila express a male germline-specific and meiotic-specific antisense transcript complementary to the reverse transcriptase (RT) and ribonuclease A (RNaseA) genes of the proviral retrotransposon. No active transposition of micropia has been registered so far. micropia is likely part of a selfish driver system responsible for the Drosophila Y chromosomal lampbrushloop evolution in some species.

Micropia was discovered after micro-cloning experiments carried out on Y-chromosomal lampbrush loops by Prof. Wolfgang Hennig. Similar loops can be found in lampbrush chromosomes (see Lampbrush chromosome) that are characteristic for the female germ cells of most animals, except mammals. The name micropia is an artificial word, i.e. a concoction of "microcloning" and "copia-like element".

== Evolutionary history ==
A 2019 comparative survey detected Micropia-related sequences in 34 Drosophilidae species and recovered 20 subfamilies, indicating a patchy distribution across the family. Earlier work on Zaprionus and melanogaster-subgroup species concluded that Micropia was introduced by multiple horizontal transfer events from different donor lineages, supporting a more complex evolutionary history than vertical inheritance alone.
