= Rhynchosciara americana =

Scientific classification
- Kingdom: Animalia
- Phylum: Arthropoda
- Class: Insecta
- Order: Diptera
- Family: Sciaridae
- Genus: Rhynchosciara
- Species: R. americana

Binomial name
- Rhynchosciara americana (Wiedemann, 1821)

Species of fly

Rhynchosciara americana is a species of fly. It has a life cycle of approximately 70 days, and the sibling larvae show a synchronized development. The larvae can reach one inch in length, and the adult fly is about 0.8 inch (20 mm). The larvae groups are usually originated from the same female posture and spin a communal cocoon where the metamorphosis will occur. The fly is scientifically notable for the physiology of its polytene chromosomes and developmentally regulated amplified puffs, first observed by Crodowaldo Pavan.

Its ecology is poorly understood, but it is assumed to be a fungus gnat. Until recently, scientists had no success in the laboratory breeding of this fly.

Polytene chromosome

Entomologist Christian Rudolph Wilhelm Wiedemann first described and classified this species in his work Diptera Exotica (1821). He had analyzed Brazilian specimens probably sent to him by colleagues or enthusiasts. European entomologists had difficulty visiting Brazil to collect samples for political reasons at the time.

In 1950, during an expedition to collect wild Drosophilidae in the shore, in São Paulo state on the southeast Brazilian coast Crodowaldo Pavan rediscovered the species and named it Rhynchosciara angelae. In 1951 the first publication on this “new” dipteran describes its morphological aspects and some habits. The synonymy was demonstrated in 1969 by Martha Breuer, and R. angelae was corrected to R. americana.

Since the early observations the giant polytene chromosomes and its puffs were noticed in several larval tissues. Similar chromosomal structures were described in Chironomus by Balbiani, and became known as "Balbiani Rings", but the incorporation of radioactive thymidine experiments in the chromosomes of Rhynchosciara americana led to the discovery of two types of puff: a transcription-related puff, where the chromatin expands and the transcription events takes place; and an amplification-related one, where the chromatin expands and RNA transcription and DNA replication occur.

In fact it was the first biological model where disproportionate DNA replication was detected. Nowadays the amplification phenomena is well-documented in several organisms, as Drosophila melanogaster, but is not totally understood. In Drosophila control elements as enhancers and replication origins were described and related to amplification phenomena, however in the Sciaridaes the puzzle is still far from solved.
