= Chironomus jangchunensis =

Scientific classification
- Kingdom: Animalia
- Phylum: Arthropoda
- Clade: Pancrustacea
- Class: Insecta
- Order: Diptera
- Family: Chironomidae
- Genus: Chironomus
- Species: C. jangchunensis

Binomial name
- Chironomus jangchunensis Ree, 2012

Species of fly

Chironomus jangchunensis is a species of nonbiting midge in the bloodworm family, Chironomidae.

It was first described in 2012 by Han Il Ree, with the species epithet, jangchunensis, describing it as coming from Jangchung-dong.

It is endemic to Korea.
