= Chironomus mongolcedeus =

Scientific classification
- Domain: Eukaryota
- Kingdom: Animalia
- Phylum: Arthropoda
- Class: Insecta
- Order: Diptera
- Family: Chironomidae
- Tribe: Chironomini
- Genus: Chironomus
- Species: C. mongolcedeus

Binomial name
- Chironomus mongolcedeus Sasa & Suzuki, 1997

Species of fly

Chironomus mongolcedeus is a species of midge in the family Chironomidae.

It was first described in 1997 by the Japanese entomologists, Manabu Sasa and Hiroshi Suzuki, from a male collected at an altitude of 1,500m, in August 1996 in Bogd, Mongolia.
