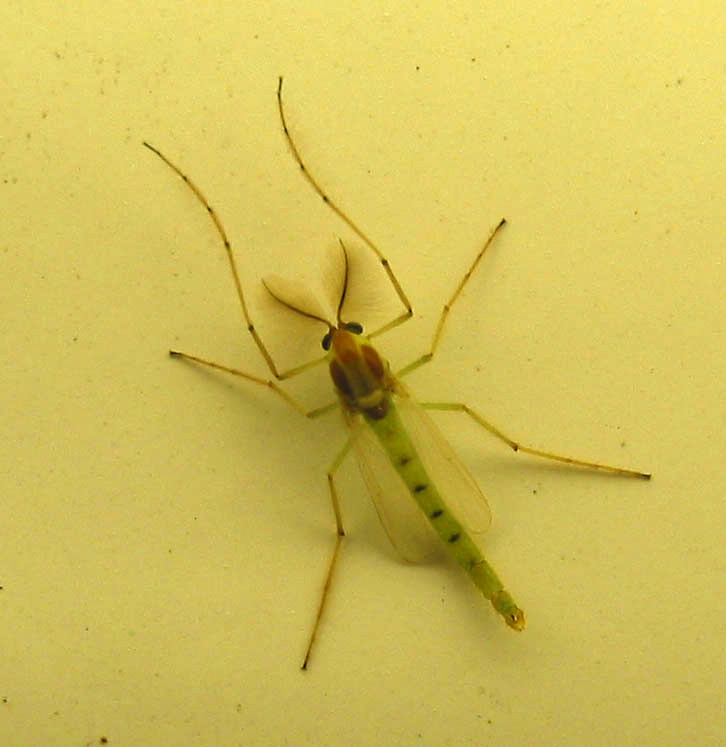

Scientific classification
- Kingdom: Animalia
- Phylum: Arthropoda
- Clade: Pancrustacea
- Class: Insecta
- Order: Diptera
- Family: Chironomidae
- Tribe: Chironomini
- Genus: Axarus; Roback, 1980

= Axarus =

Genus of midges

Axarus is widely distributed genus of non-biting midges with records from the Holarctic, the Neotropics and Australasia. There are currently five described nearctic species. Erected as a subgenus (Anceus) of Xenochironomus, Axarus was subsequently renamed and elevated to generic status. The Connecticut River in the eastern United States harbors locally dense populations of two Axarus species, both currently undescribed. These populations are interesting in that they are restricted to specific larval habitat (varve clay and sometimes rotting wood) and thus there is genetic structure between populations in the river. The Connecticut River species are also notable in that they have extremely well developed polytene chromosomes and also maintain a high degree of inversion polymorphism.

== Species ==
These 16 species belong to the genus Axarus:

- Axarus cordiformis Pinho, Dantas & Hamada, 2019
- Axarus corgao Andersen, Mendes & Hagenlund, 2018
- Axarus corycus Mendes & Andersen, 2010
- Axarus diabolicus Andersen, Mendes & Hagenlund, 2018
- Axarus dorneri (Malloch, 1915)
- Axarus festivus (Say, 1823)
- Axarus froehlichi Andersen & Mendes, 2002
- Axarus fungorum (Albu, 1980)
- Axarus globosus Donato, Mauad & Andersen, 2018
- Axarus intervales Andersen, Mendes & Hagenlund, 2018
- Axarus meloi Andersen, Mendes & Hagenlund, 2018
- Axarus ochros (Walley, 1934)
- Axarus rogersi (Beck & Beck, 1958)
- Axarus scopula (Townes, 1945)
- Axarus taenionotus (Say, 1829)
- Axarus villosus Mendes & Andersen, 2010
