= Chironomus riparius =

Scientific classification
- Kingdom: Animalia
- Phylum: Arthropoda
- Clade: Pancrustacea
- Class: Insecta
- Order: Diptera
- Family: Chironomidae
- Genus: Chironomus
- Species: C. riparius

Binomial name
- Chironomus riparius (Meigen, 1804)

Synonyms
- Chironomus thummi (Kieffer, 1911)

Species of fly

Chironomus riparius, also known as Chironomus thummi and commonly known as the harlequin fly, is a species of non-biting midge. Their larvae are known by the common name of blood worm due to their red colouration. It is common in both North America and Europe. The species was described in 1804 by Johann Wilhelm Meigen. C. riparius has been used extensively as a model for genome structure analysis in insects and is also used in toxicology tests and functional developmental genetic studies. Both their adult and larval forms have been implicated as disease vectors but are also an important part of freshwater food chains.

== Taxonomy ==
German naturalist Johann Wilhelm Meigen named the genus Chironomus in 1803 and described the harlequin fly species in 1804 as Chironomus riparius.

== Description ==
Harlequin flies are small dipterans which resemble mosquitoes.

== Life cycle ==
Eggs are laid in or near the water. Larvae are red due to a large amount of haemoglobin in their blood, which leads to their common name of blood worms. The larvae use this haemoglobin as an oxygen store, allowing them to survive in low oxygen conditions such as at the bottom of a lake or in areas with high organic pollution. Larvae build chimneys to live in and protect them from hypoxia until they are ready to become adults. Adults live for only a short period of two or three days. Males form a large mating swarm which the females fly into to select a mate to breed.

== Distribution and habitat ==
The harlequin fly is found in North America, primarily on the east coast but often also found in southern Alaska and throughout northern Europe, ranging from as far north as northern Scotland to southern Germany.

== Predation ==
Larvae are predated upon by many other species of insect and also by fish.

== Use in genetic experimentation ==
Chironomus riparius are easy to maintain in a laboratory environment and has been used extensively as a model for genome structure analysis in insects and is also used in toxicology tests and functional developmental genetic studies.

== Disease vector ==
Both their adult and larval forms have been implicated as disease vectors. As they tend to emerge in large numbers, they have been reported to cause pest problems. During development the flies’ discard exoskeleton fragments and the particulate can accumulate in settlements close to the lakes and rivers where the flies reside. This particulate, combined with particles from the decomposing bodies of the swarms of flies, can cause conjunctivitis, rhinitis and asthma by inhalation.

== Use in forensic entomology ==
In June 2013, the corpse of a young woman was found floating in a stretch of the Genil river located in an urban environment in Granada (Spain, SE Iberian Peninsula). Several C. riparius larvae were found on the scalp during the autopsy and identified morphologically and by molecular biology methods. The life cycle of this species was very useful when assessing the postmortem interval (PMI), that is, the time elapsed from death to the finding of the corpse. In this case, a PMI of about two weeks was estimated. This was the first time that developmental parameters were used in an aquatic forensic context.
