= Chironomus atroviridis =

- In Virginia, United States

Scientific classification
- Kingdom: Animalia
- Phylum: Arthropoda
- Clade: Pancrustacea
- Class: Insecta
- Order: Diptera
- Family: Chironomidae
- Tribe: Chironomini
- Genus: Chironomus
- Species: C. atroviridis

Binomial name
- Chironomus atroviridis (Townes, 1945)

Synonyms
- Tendipes atroviridis Townes, 1945

Species of fly

Chironomus atroviridis is a species of midge in the family Chironomidae.
