= Polytene chromosome =

Large chromosome with thousands of DNA strands

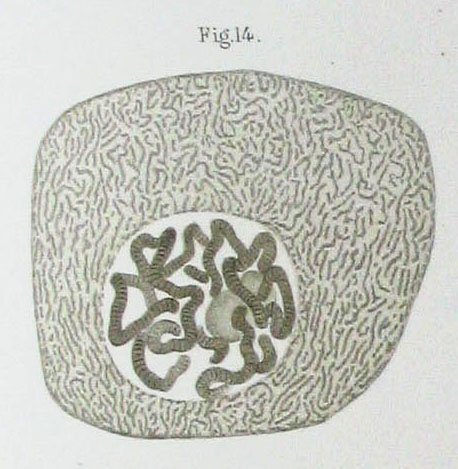
Polytene chromosomes in a Chironomus salivary gland cell

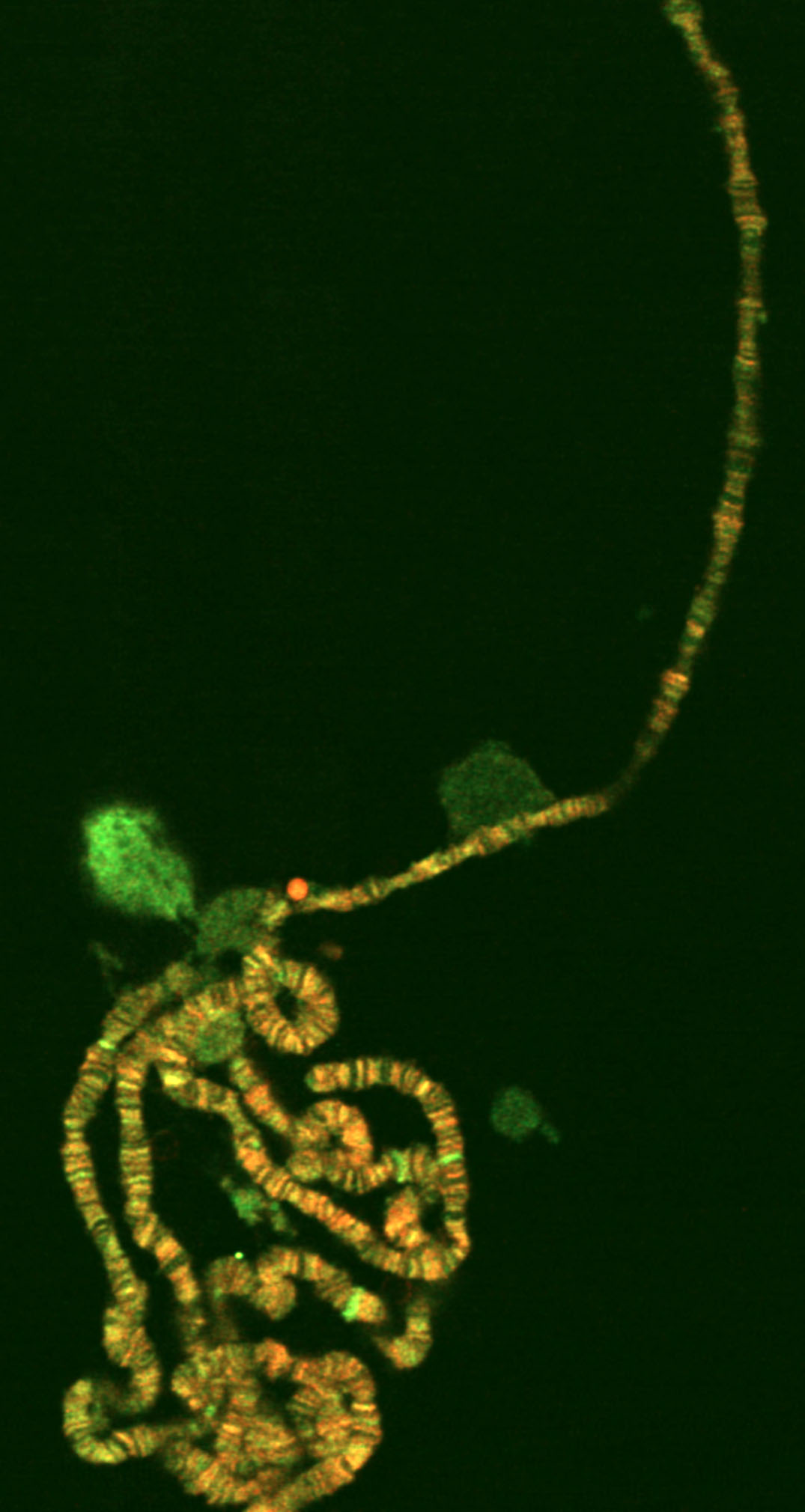
Set of polytene chromosomes

Polytene chromosomes are large chromosomes which have thousands of DNA strands. They provide a high level of function in certain tissues such as salivary glands of insects.

Polytene chromosomes were first reported by E.G.Balbiani in 1881. Polytene chromosomes are found in dipteran flies: the best understood are those of Drosophila, Chironomus and Rhynchosciara. They are present in another group of arthropods of the class Collembola, a protozoan group Ciliophora, mammalian trophoblasts and antipodal, and suspensor cells in plants. In insects, they are commonly found in the salivary glands when the cells are enlarged but not divided.

They are produced when repeated rounds of DNA replication without cell division occur. Thus polytene chromosomes form when multiple rounds of replication produce many sister chromatids which stay fused together.

Polytene chromosomes, at interphase, are seen to have patterns of distinct thick and thin bands. These patterns were originally used to help map chromosomes, identify small chromosome mutations, and in taxonomic identification. They are now used to study the function of genes in transcription.

== Function ==
In addition to increasing the volume of the cells' nuclei and causing cell expansion, such cells may also have a metabolic advantage as multiple copies of genes permits a high level of gene expression. In Drosophila melanogaster, for example, the chromosomes of the larval salivary glands undergo many rounds of endoreduplication to produce large quantities of adhesive mucoprotein ("glue") before pupation. Another example within the fly itself is the tandem duplication of various polytene bands located near the centromere of the X chromosome which results in the Bar phenotype of kidney-shaped eyes.

The interbands are involved in the interaction with the active chromatin proteins, nucleosome remodeling, and origin recognition complexes. Their primary functions are: to act as binding sites for RNA pol II, to initiate replication and, to start nucleosome remodeling of short fragments of DNA.

== Structure ==
In insects, polytene chromosomes are commonly found in the salivary glands; they are also referred to as "salivary gland chromosomes". The large size of the chromosome is due to the presence of many longitudinal strands called chromonemata; hence the name polytene (many stranded). They are about 0.5 mm in length and 20 μm in diameter. The chromosomal strands are formed after repeated DNA multiplication within the chromosomes in the absence of muclear and cytoplasmic division. This type of enlargement is called ″polytemization″. The polytene chromosome contains two types of bands, dark bands and interbands. The dark bands are darkly stained, and the inter bands are lightly stained with nuclear stains. The dark bands contain more DNA and less RNA. The interbands contain more RNA and less DNA. The amount of DNA in interbands ranges from 0.8 - 25%.

The bands of polytene chromosomes become enlarged at certain times to form swellings called puffs. The formation of puffs is called puffing. In the regions of puffs, the chromonemata uncoil and open out to form many loops. The puffing is caused by the uncoiling of individual chromomeres in a band. The puffs indicate the site of active genes where mRNA synthesis takes place. The chromonemata of puffs give out a series of many loops laterally. As these loops appear as rings, they are called Balbiani rings after the name of the researcher who discovered them. They are formed of DNA, RNA and a few proteins. As they are the site of transcription, transcription mechanisms such as RNA polymerase and ribonucleoproteins are present.

In protozoans, there is no transcription, since the puff consists only of DNA.

== History ==
Polytene chromosomes were originally observed in the larval salivary glands of Chironomus midges by Édouard-Gérard Balbiani in 1881. Balbiani described the chromosomal puffs among the tangled thread inside the nucleus, and named it "permanent spireme". In 1890, he observed similar spireme in a ciliated protozoan Loxophyllum meleagris. The existence of such spireme in Drosophila melanogaster was reported by Bulgarian geneticist Dontcho Kostoff in 1930. Kostoff predicted that the discs (bands) which he observed were "the actual packets in which inherited characters are passed from generation to generation."

The hereditary nature of these structures was not confirmed until they were studied by German biologists Emil Heitz and Hans Bauer in the midge Bibio hortulanus 1933. Later on, Heitz studied different species of Drosophila (D. melanogaster, D. simulans, D. hydei, and D. virilis) and found that all their interphase chromatins in certain cells were swollen and messy. In 1932, he collaborated with Karl Heinrich Bauer with whom he discovered that the tangled chromosomes having distinct bands are unique to the cells of the salivary glands, midgut, Malphigian tubules, and brain of the flies Bibio hortulanus and Drosophila funebris. The two papers were published in the early 1933. Unaware of these papers, an American geneticist Theophilus Shickel Painter reported in December 1933 the existence of giant chromosome in D. melanogaster (followed by a series of papers the following year). Learning of this, Heitz accused Painter of deliberately ignoring their original publication to claim priority of discovery. In 1935, Hermann J. Muller and A.A. Prokofyeva established that the individual band or part of a band corresponds with a gene in Drosophila. The same year, P.C. Koller hesitantly introduced the name "polytene" to describe the giant chromosome, writing:

It seems that we can regard these chromosomes as corresponding with paired pachytene chromosomes at meiosis in which the intercalary parts between chromomeres have been stretched and separated into smaller units, and in which, instead of two threads lying side by side, we have 16 or even more. Hence they are "polytene" rather than pachytene; I do not, however, propose to use this term; I shall refer to them as "multiple threads."

== Occurrence ==
Polytene chromosomes are present in secretory tissues of dipteran insects such as the Malpighian tubules of Sciara and also in protists, plants, mammals, or in cells from other insects. Some of the largest polytene chromosomes described thus far occur in larval salivary gland cells of the chironomid genus Axarus.

In plants, they are found in only a few species, and are restricted to ovary and immature seed tissues such as in Phaseolus coccineus and P. vulgaris (Nagl, 1981), and the anther tapetum of Vigna unguiculata and of some Phaseolus species.

Polytene chromosomes are also used to identify the species of chironomid larvae that are notoriously difficult to identify. Each morphologically distinct group of larvae consists of a number of morphologically identical (sibling) species that can only be identified by rearing adult males or by cytogenetic analysis of the polytene chromosomes of the larvae. Karyotypes are used to confirm the presence of specific species and to study genetic diversity in species with a wide range of genetic variation.
