= Chironomus tusimaabeus =

Scientific classification
- Domain: Eukaryota
- Kingdom: Animalia
- Phylum: Arthropoda
- Class: Insecta
- Order: Diptera
- Family: Chironomidae
- Tribe: Chironomini
- Genus: Chironomus
- Species: C. tusimaabeus

Binomial name
- Chironomus tusimaabeus Sasa & Suzuki, 1999

Species of fly

Chironomus tusimaabeus is a species of midge in the family Chironomidae.

The species was first described in 1999 by the Japanese entomologists, Manabu Sasa & Hiroshi Suzuki, from three males collected on Tsushima Island at Kechi and Nita dams. It differs from most other males of this genus by having a body which is almost uniformly black.
