= Chironomus ginzanabeus =

Scientific classification
- Domain: Eukaryota
- Kingdom: Animalia
- Phylum: Arthropoda
- Class: Insecta
- Order: Diptera
- Family: Chironomidae
- Tribe: Chironomini
- Genus: Chironomus
- Species: C. ginzanabeus

Binomial name
- Chironomus ginzanabeus Sasa & Suzuki, 2001

Species of fly

Chironomus ginzanabeus is a species of midge in the family Chironomidae.

It was first described in 2001 by Manabu Sasa and Hiroshi Suzuki, from a male collected at Ginzan, on Hokkaido.
