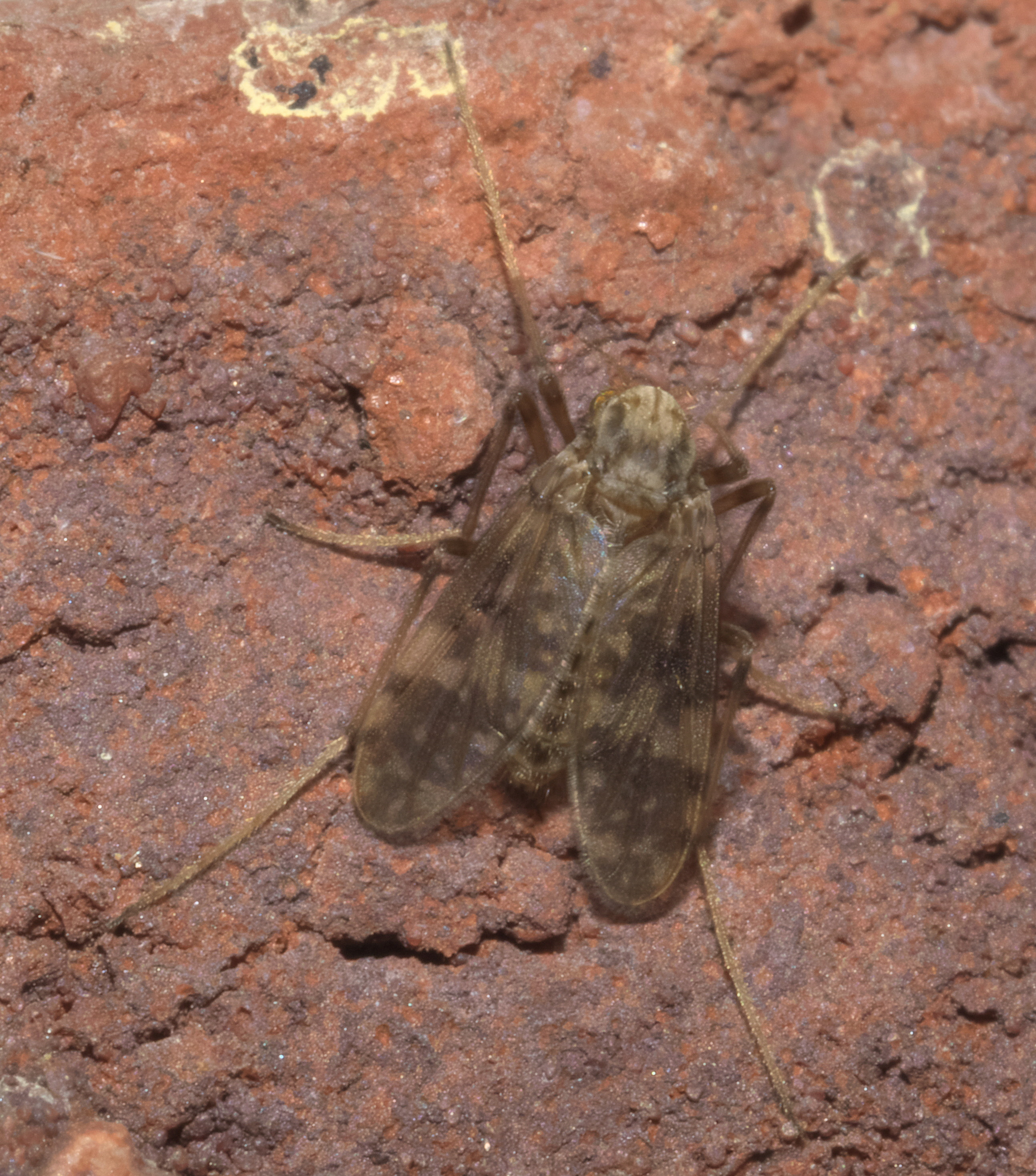

Scientific classification
- Kingdom: Animalia
- Phylum: Arthropoda
- Class: Insecta
- Order: Diptera
- Family: Chironomidae
- Genus: Psectrotanypus
- Species: P. dyari

Binomial name
- Psectrotanypus dyari (Coquillett, 1902)

Synonyms
- Anatopynia decolorata Malloch; Tanypus dyari Coquillett, 1902; Tanypus garretti Walley, 1925; Tanypus guttularis Coquillett, 1902

= Psectrotanypus dyari =

Species of fly

Psectrotanypus dyari is a species of midge in the family Chironomidae.

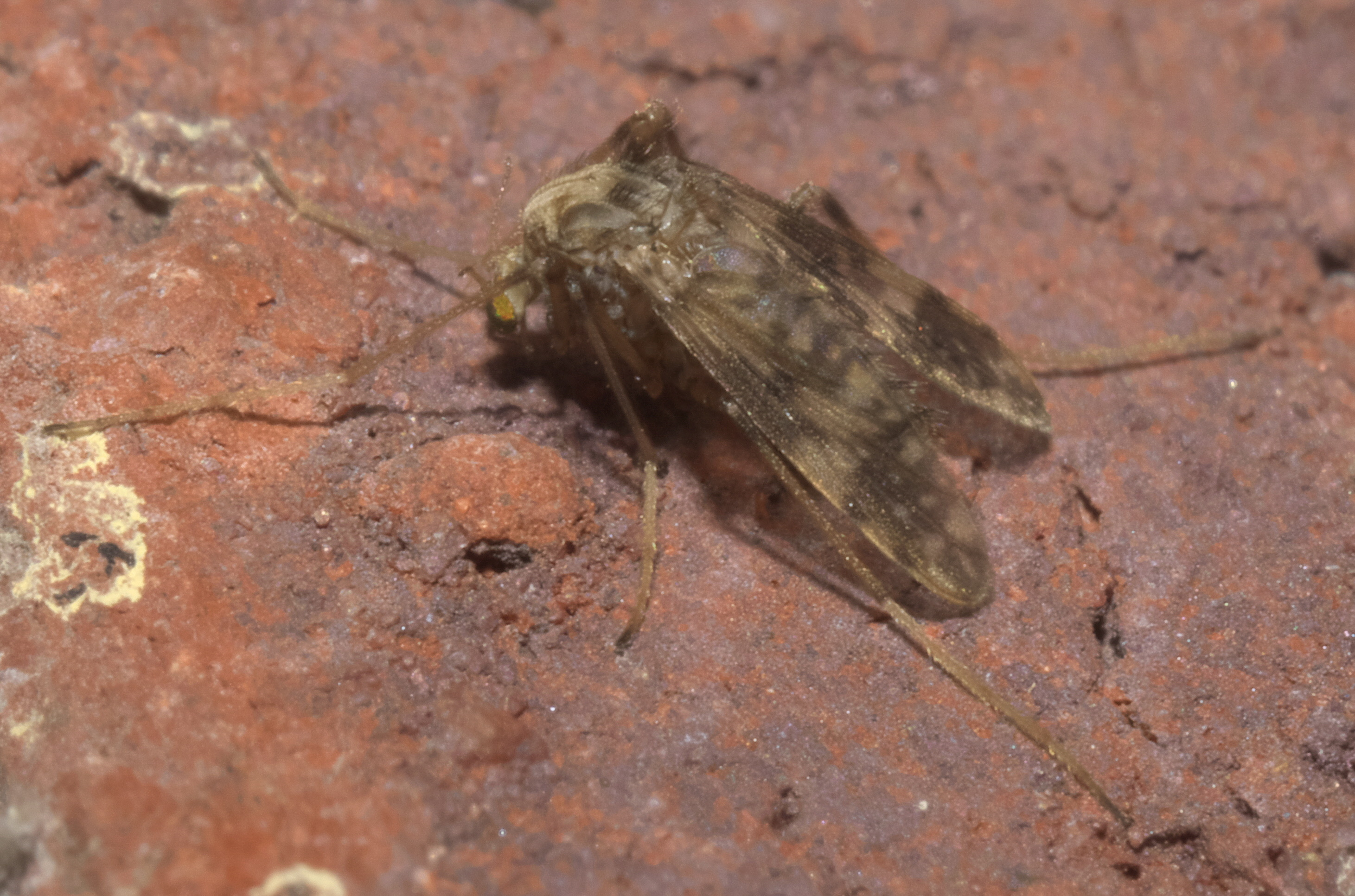
