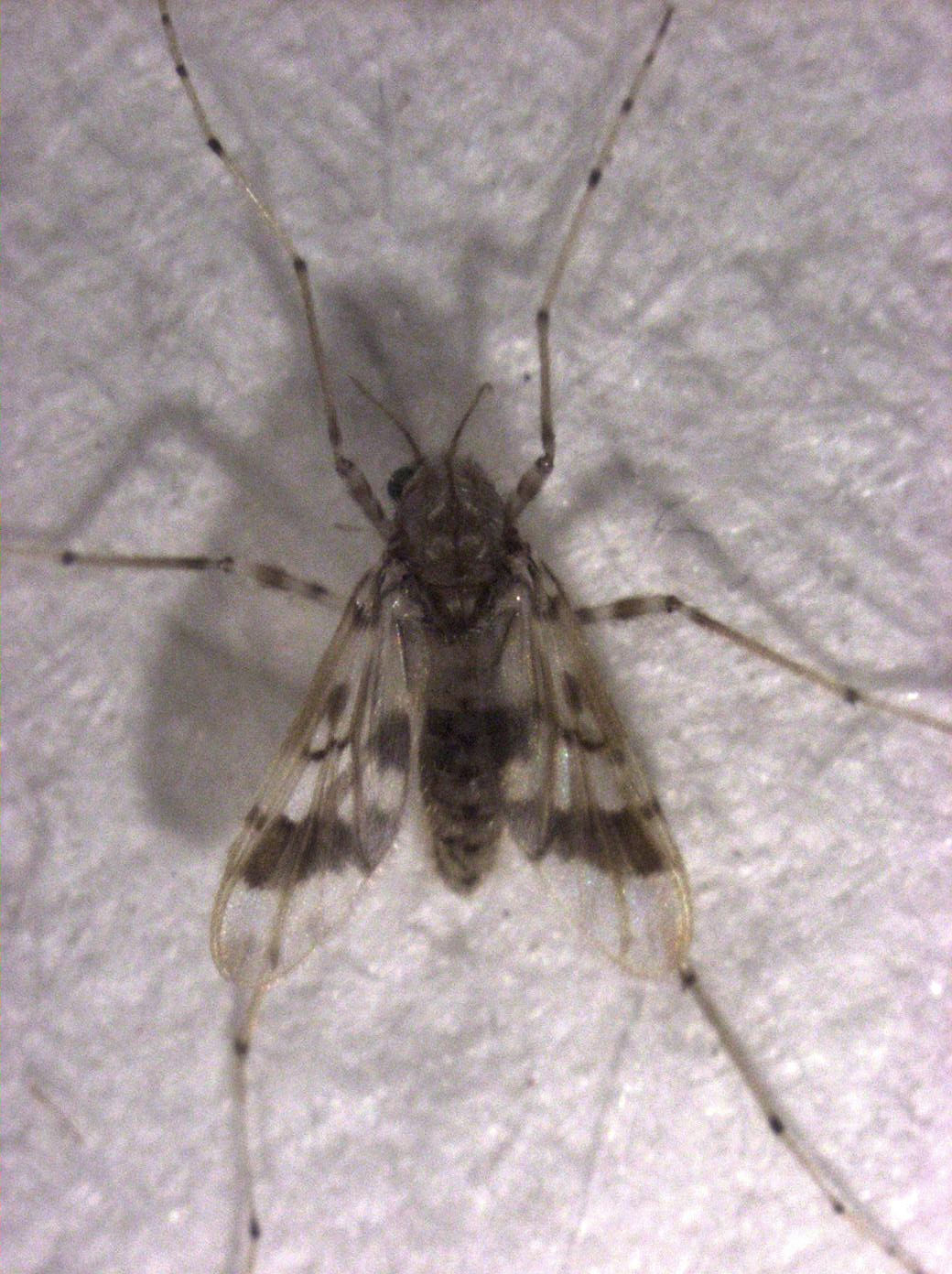

Scientific classification
- Kingdom: Animalia
- Phylum: Arthropoda
- Clade: Pancrustacea
- Class: Insecta
- Order: Diptera
- Family: Chironomidae
- Subfamily: Tanypodinae
- Tribe: Macropelopiini
- Genus: Apsectrotanypus; Fittkau, 1962

= Apsectrotanypus =

Genus of flies

Apsectrotanypus is a genus of midges in the family Chironomidae. There are six recognized species in Apsectrotanypus.

== Species ==
These six species belong to the genus Apsectrotanypus:

- Apsectrotanypus algens (Coquillett, 1902)^{i c g}
- Apsectrotanypus johnsoni (Coquillett, 1901)^{i c g b}
- Apsectrotanypus maculosus (Freeman, 1961)^{c}
- Apsectrotanypus trifascipennis (Zetterstedt, 1838)^{i c g}
- Apsectrotanypus unicolor (Freeman, 1954)^{c g}
- Apsectrotanypus yoshimurai (Tokunaga, 1937)^{c g}

Data sources: i = ITIS, c = Catalogue of Life, g = GBIF, b = Bugguide.net
