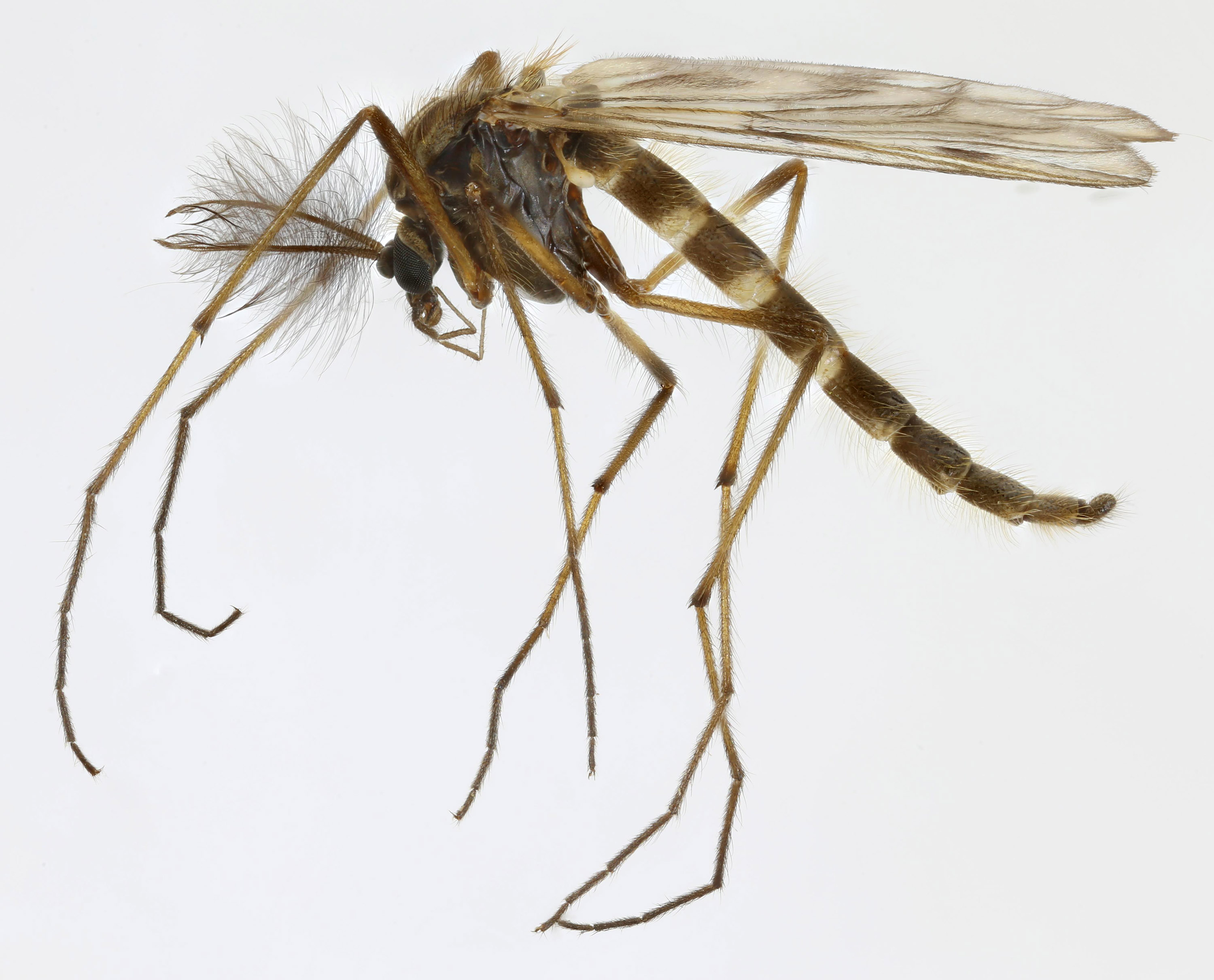
- Macropelopia nebulosa

Scientific classification
- Kingdom: Animalia
- Phylum: Arthropoda
- Class: Insecta
- Order: Diptera
- Family: Chironomidae
- Subfamily: Tanypodinae
- Tribe: Macropelopiini
- Genus: Macropelopia; Thienemann, 1916

= Macropelopia =

Genus of flies

Macropelopia is a genus of European non-biting midges in the subfamily Tanypodinae of the bloodworm family (Chironomidae).
