= Chironomus whitseli =

Scientific classification
- Domain: Eukaryota
- Kingdom: Animalia
- Phylum: Arthropoda
- Class: Insecta
- Order: Diptera
- Family: Chironomidae
- Tribe: Chironomini
- Genus: Chironomus
- Species: C. whitseli

Binomial name
- Chironomus whitseli Sublette & Sublette, 1974

Species of fly

Chironomus whitseli is one of the species of midge in the family Chironomidae.
