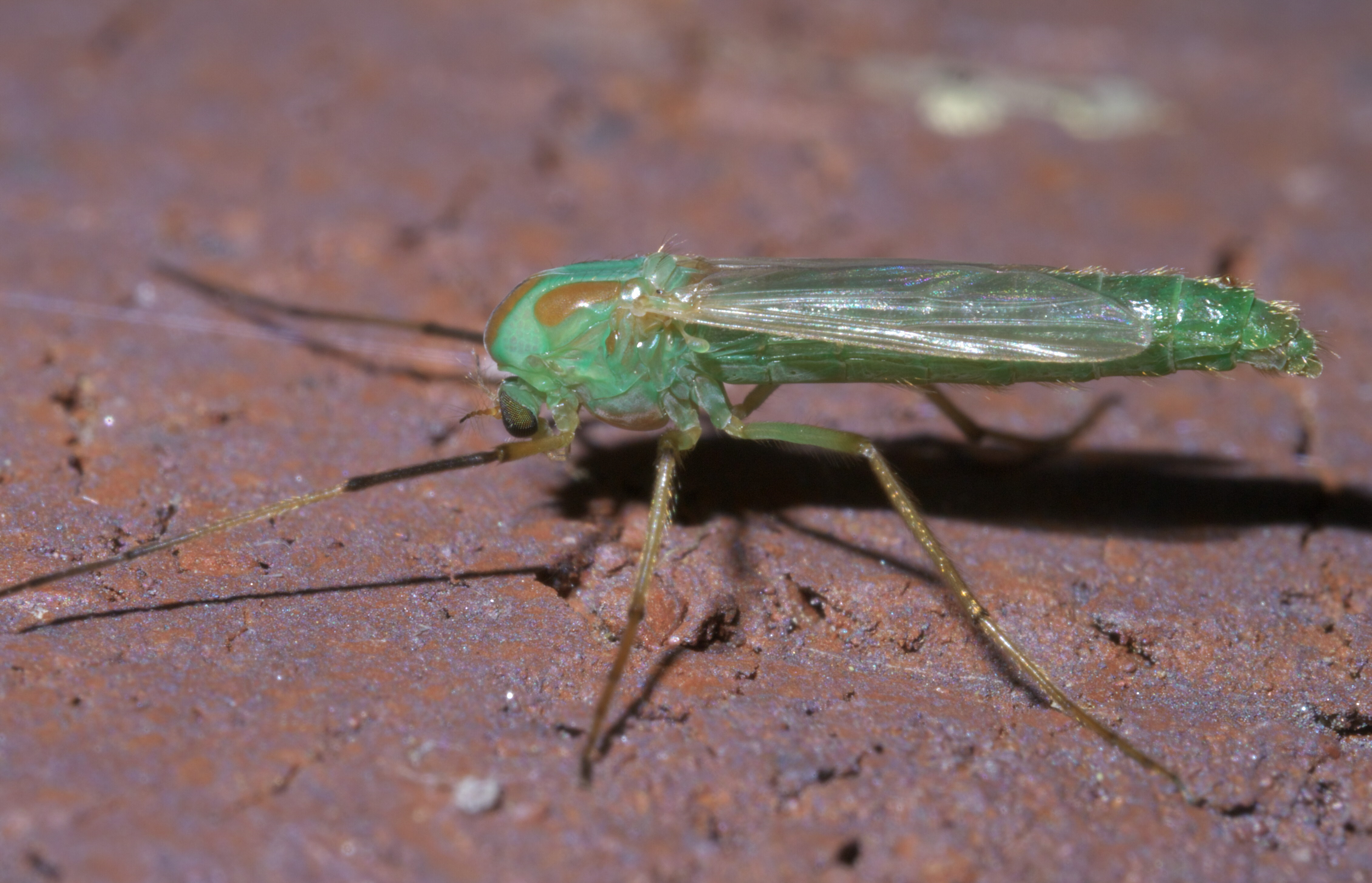

Scientific classification
- Domain: Eukaryota
- Kingdom: Animalia
- Phylum: Arthropoda
- Class: Insecta
- Order: Diptera
- Family: Chironomidae
- Genus: Axarus
- Species: A. festivus

Binomial name
- Axarus festivus Say

= Axarus festivus =

Species of fly

Axarus festivus is a species of midge in the family Chironomidae.
