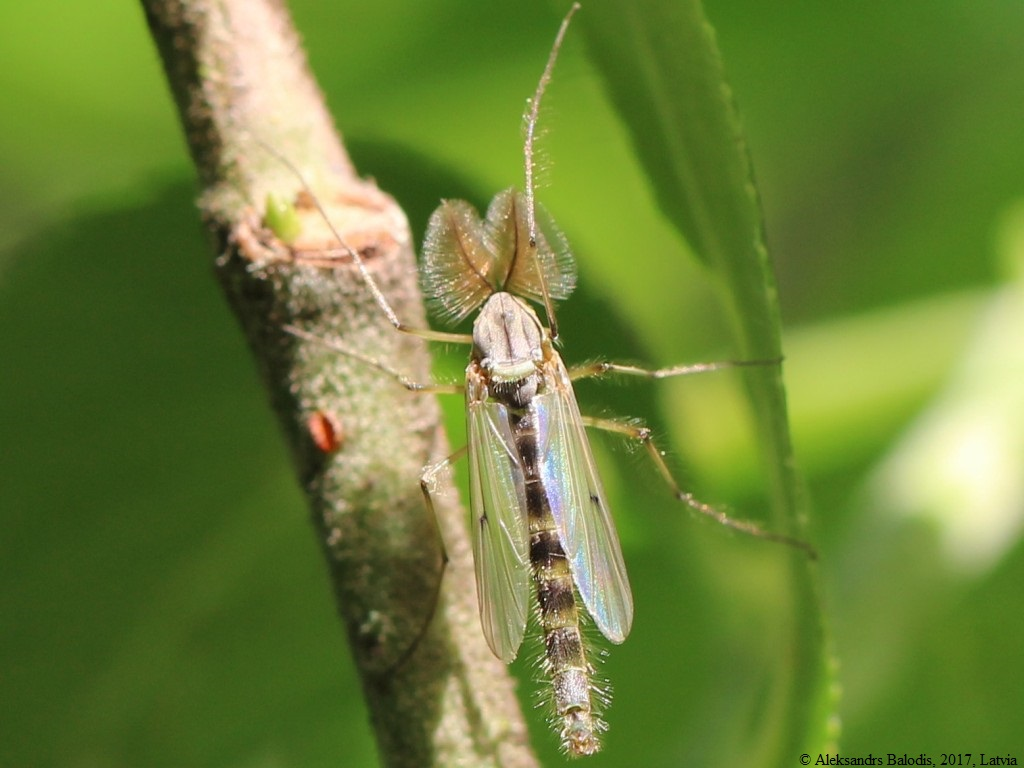

Scientific classification
- Kingdom: Animalia
- Phylum: Arthropoda
- Class: Insecta
- Order: Diptera
- Family: Chironomidae
- Genus: Chironomus
- Species: C. tentans

Binomial name
- Chironomus tentans Fabricius 1805

= Chironomus tentans =

Species of fly

Chironomus tentans is a species in the family Chironomidae (non-biting midges) in the order Diptera (true flies). Like several other species of Chironomidae, C. tentans can be easily and quickly cultivated in laboratories thanks to the species' short lifecycle. Their larvae make good candidates for toxicity tests.
