= Macropelopiini =

Scientific classification
- Kingdom: Animalia
- Phylum: Arthropoda
- Clade: Pancrustacea
- Class: Insecta
- Order: Diptera
- Family: Chironomidae
- Subfamily: Tanypodinae
- Tribe: Macropelopiini

Genera
- See text

Tribe of flies

Macropelopiini is a tribe of midges in the non-biting midge family (Chironomidae).

== Genera & species ==
- Genus Apsectrotanypus Fittkau, 1962

- A. trifascipennis (Zetterstedt, 1838)

- Genus Macropelopia Thienemann, 1916

- M. adaucta Kieffer in Thienemann & Kieffer, 1916
- M. nebulosa (Meigen, 1804)
- M. notata (Meigen, 1818)

- Genus Psectrotanypus Kieffer, 1909

- Subgenus Psectrotanypus Kieffer, 1909

- P. varius (Fabricius, 1787)
