= Chironomus atrella =

Scientific classification
- Domain: Eukaryota
- Kingdom: Animalia
- Phylum: Arthropoda
- Class: Insecta
- Order: Diptera
- Family: Chironomidae
- Tribe: Chironomini
- Genus: Chironomus
- Species: C. atrella

Binomial name
- Chironomus atrella (Townes, 1945)

Synonyms
- Tendipes atrella Townes, 1945

Species of fly

Chironomus atrella is a species of midge in the family Chironomidae.
