= Chironomus staegeri =

Scientific classification
- Domain: Eukaryota
- Kingdom: Animalia
- Phylum: Arthropoda
- Class: Insecta
- Order: Diptera
- Family: Chironomidae
- Tribe: Chironomini
- Genus: Chironomus
- Species: C. staegeri

Binomial name
- Chironomus staegeri Lundbeck, 1898

Synonyms
- Chironomus fasciventris Malloch, 1915

Species of fly

Chironomus staegeri is a species of midge in the family Chironomidae. It is found in Europe.
