= Chironomus claggi =

Scientific classification
- Kingdom: Animalia
- Phylum: Arthropoda
- Clade: Pancrustacea
- Class: Insecta
- Order: Diptera
- Family: Chironomidae
- Subfamily: Chironominae
- Tribe: Chironomini
- Genus: Chironomus
- Species: C. claggi

Binomial name
- Chironomus claggi Tokunaga, 1964

Synonyms
- Chironomus simantobeceus Sasa, Suzuki & Sakai, 1998

Species of non-biting midges

Chironomus claggi is a species of non-biting midge in the family Chironomidae.

It was first described in 1964 by Masaaki Tokunaga, and was then redescribed in 1998 by Manabu Sasa, Hiroshi Suzuki and Tetsuo Suzuki as Chironomus simatobeceus, with their type specimen described as having been found near the mouth of Shimanto River.
