= Rhynchosciara =

Scientific classification
- Domain: Eukaryota
- Kingdom: Animalia
- Phylum: Arthropoda
- Class: Insecta
- Order: Diptera
- Family: Sciaridae
- Genus: Rhynchosciara; Rübsaamen, 1894

Genus of flies

Rhynchosciara is a genus of flies belonging to the family Sciaridae.

The species of this genus are found in Central America.

Species:

- Rhynchosciara americana (Wiedemann, 1821)
- Rhynchosciara baschanti Breuer, 1967
- Rhynchosciara brevicornis Rubsaamen, 1894
- Rhynchosciara busaccai Breuer, 1969
- Rhynchosciara cognata (Walker, 1848)
- Rhynchosciara grelleti Breuer, 1969
- Rhynchosciara guimaraesi Breuer, 1969
- Rhynchosciara hollaenderi Toledo, 1969
- Rhynchosciara mathildae Breuer, 1969
- Rhynchosciara milleri Pavan & Breuer, 1955
- Rhynchosciara papaveroi Breuer, 1971
- Rhynchosciara primogenita (Walker, 1856)
- Rhynchosciara propingua (Walker, 1848)
- Rhynchosciara vespertillio (Schiner, 1868)
