= Chironomus okinawanus =

Scientific classification
- Kingdom: Animalia
- Phylum: Arthropoda
- Clade: Pancrustacea
- Class: Insecta
- Order: Diptera
- Family: Chironomidae
- Tribe: Chironomini
- Genus: Chironomus
- Species: C. okinawanus

Binomial name
- Chironomus okinawanus Hasegawa & Sasa, 1987

Synonyms
- Chironomus tokarabeceus Sasa & Suzuki, 1995; Chironomus sp. "Okinawa-yusurika" Sasa & Hasegawa 1983; Chironomus okicontractus Sasa, 1993

Species of fly

Chironomus okinawanus is a species of midge in the family Chironomidae.

The species was first described in 1987 by the Japanese entomologists Hideo Hasegawa & Manabu Sasa, from pupae and a male adult collected on Okinawa Island. It was later redescribed in 1995 as Chironomus tokarabeceus by Manabu Sasa & Hiroshi Suzuki, from a specimen collected from the Tokara Islands.
