= Chironomus ochreatus =

- In Georgia, United States

Scientific classification
- Kingdom: Animalia
- Phylum: Arthropoda
- Clade: Pancrustacea
- Class: Insecta
- Order: Diptera
- Family: Chironomidae
- Genus: Chironomus
- Species: C. ochreatus

Binomial name
- Chironomus ochreatus (Townes, 1945)

Synonyms
- Tendipes ochreatus Townes, 1945

Species of fly

In Pennsylvania, United States

Chironomus ochreatus is a species in the family Chironomidae ("midges"), in the order Diptera ("flies").
