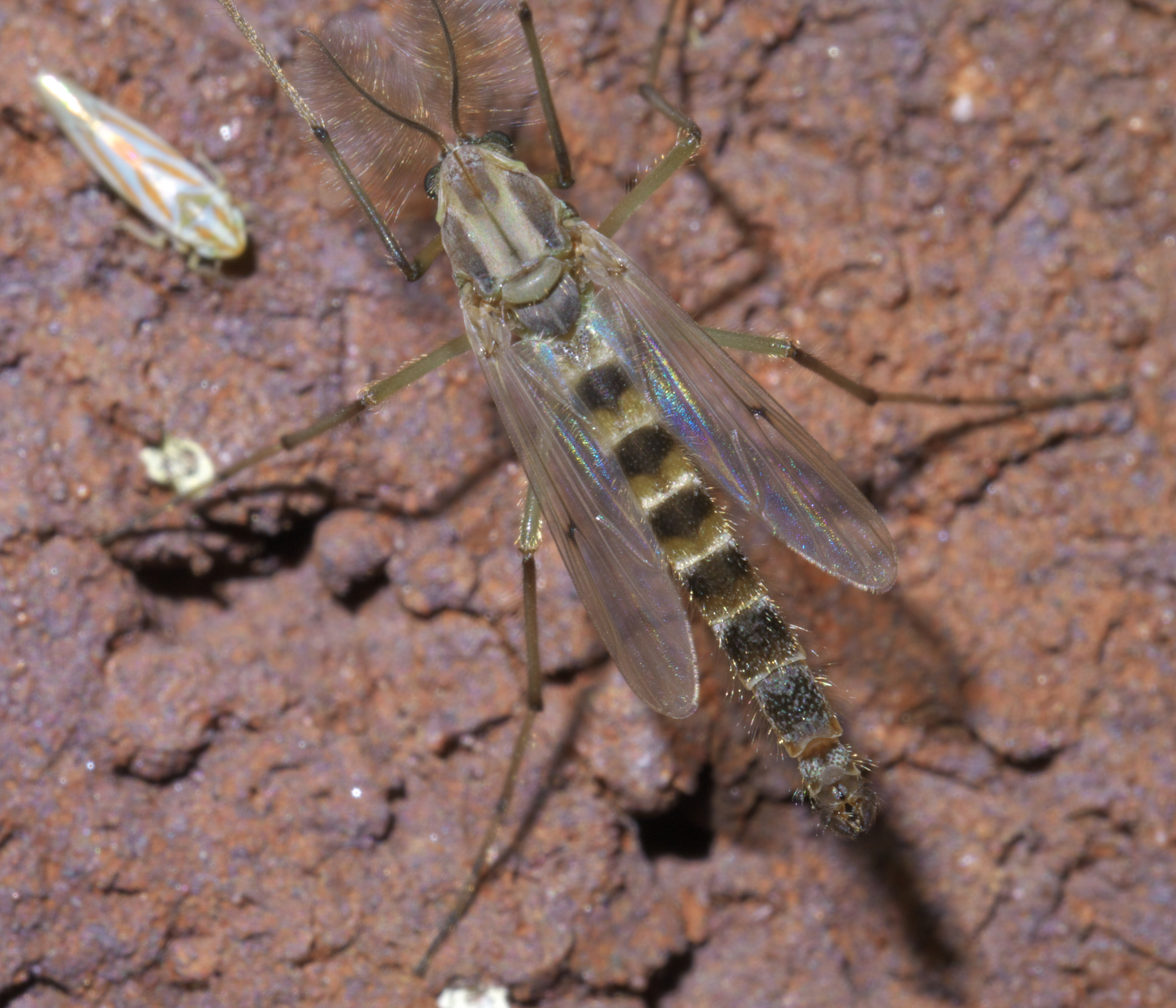

Scientific classification
- Kingdom: Animalia
- Phylum: Arthropoda
- Class: Insecta
- Order: Diptera
- Family: Chironomidae
- Tribe: Chironomini
- Genus: Chironomus
- Species: C. crassicaudatus

Binomial name
- Chironomus crassicaudatus Malloch, 1915

= Chironomus crassicaudatus =

Species of fly

Chironomus crassicaudatus, commonly known as the thick-skinned midge, is a species of midge in the family Chironomidae.

== Distribution ==
It is found from Texas to New York in the United States.
