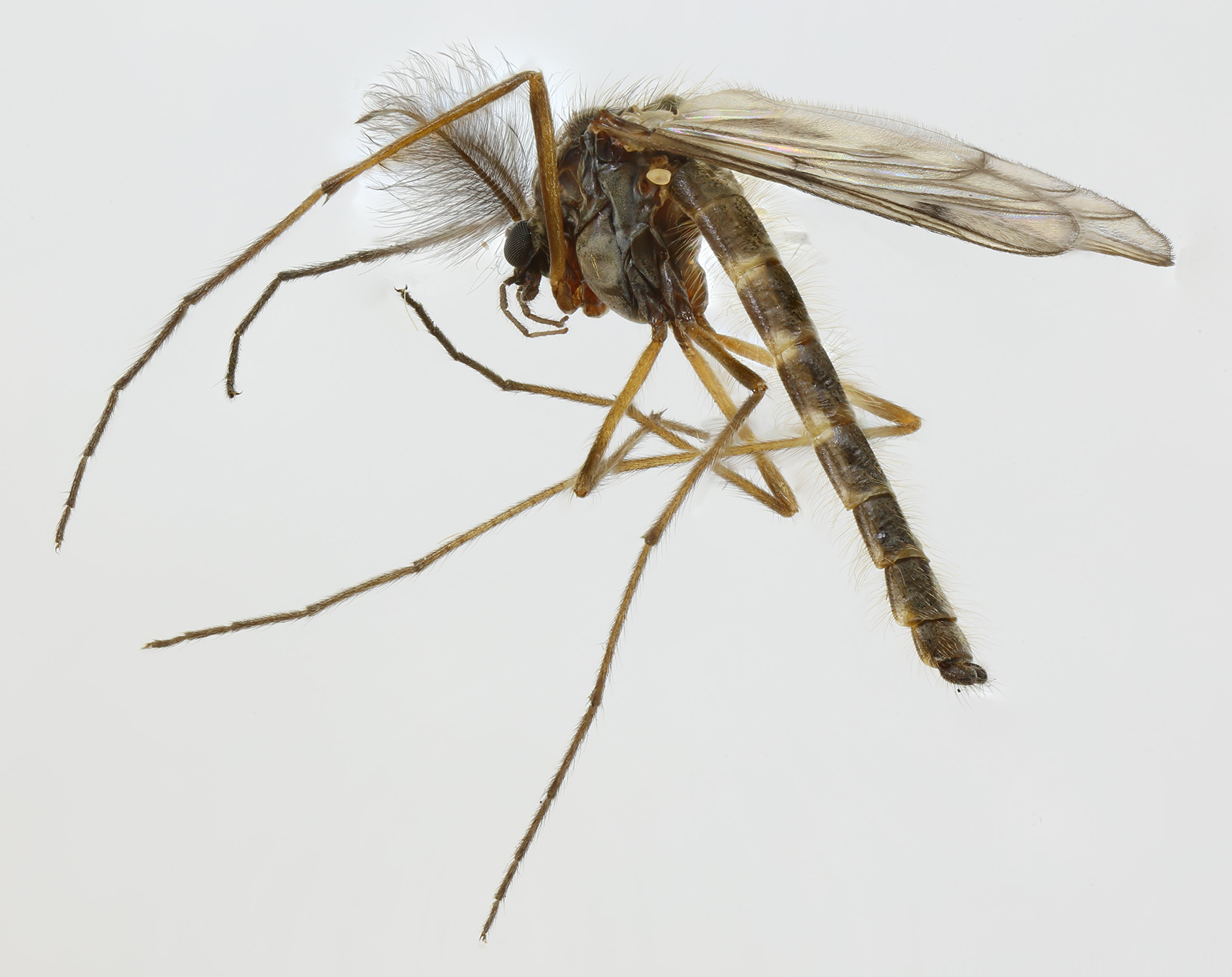
- Macropelopia nebulosa North Wales

Scientific classification
- Kingdom: Animalia
- Phylum: Arthropoda
- Class: Insecta
- Order: Diptera
- Family: Chironomidae
- Genus: Macropelopia
- Species: M. nebulosa

Binomial name
- Macropelopia nebulosa (Meigen, 1804)

= Macropelopia nebulosa =

Species of fly

Macropelopia nebulosa is a species of fly in the family Chironomidae. It is found in the Palearctic.

== Description ==
A small species of non-biting midge with a strongly marked wing pattern. It is recommended when identifying Chironomidae species that detailed examination takes place.
