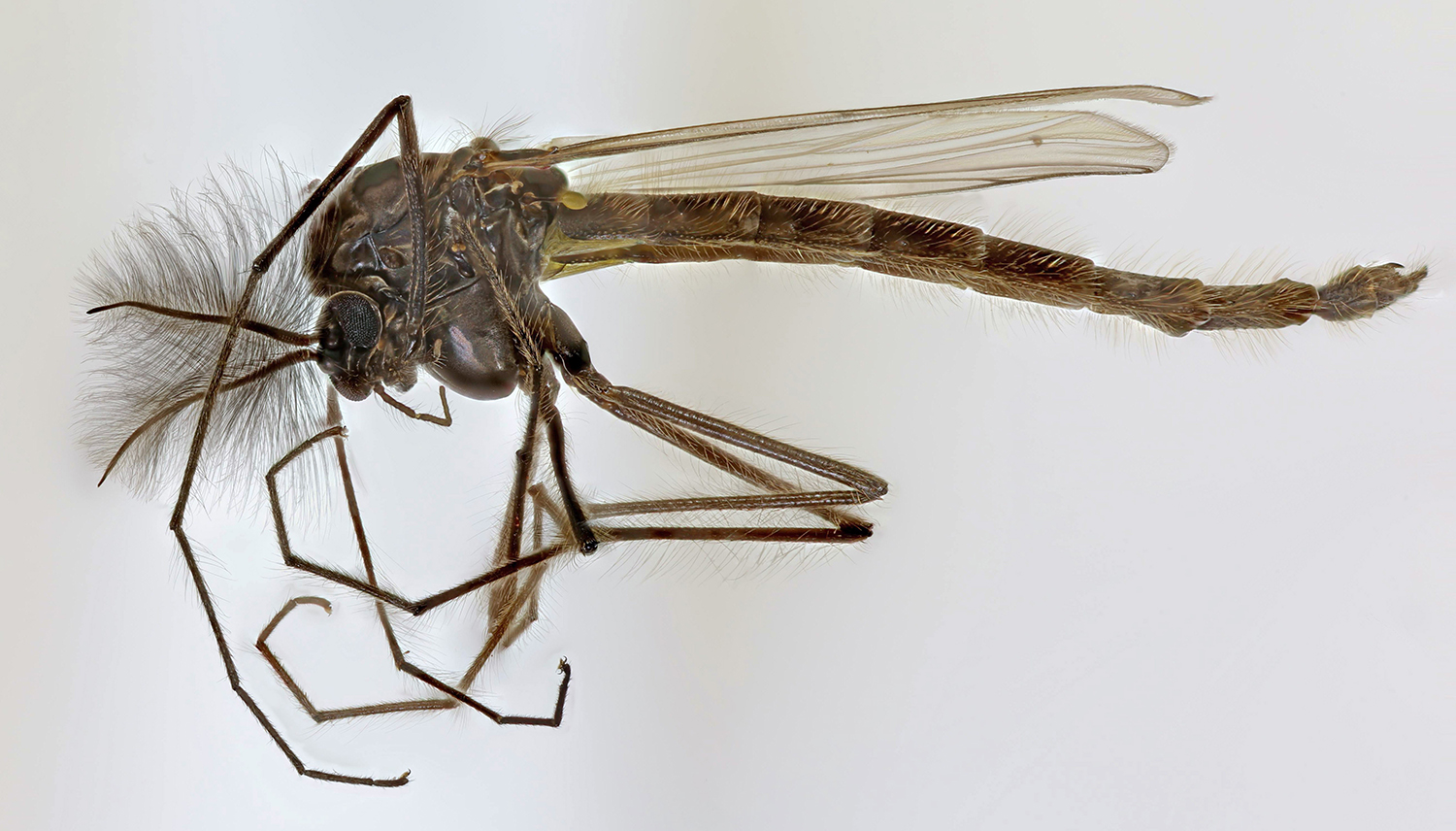
- Chironomus anthracinus North Wales

Scientific classification
- Kingdom: Animalia
- Phylum: Arthropoda
- Class: Insecta
- Order: Diptera
- Family: Chironomidae
- Genus: Chironomus
- Species: C. anthracinus

Binomial name
- Chironomus anthracinus Zetterstedt, 1860

= Chironomus anthracinus =

Species of fly

Chironomus anthracinus is a species of fly in the family Chironomidae. It is found in the Palearctic.
