= Lampbrush chromosome =

Chromosome appearance found in growing oocytes

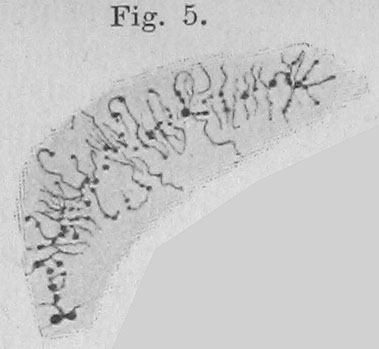
Lampbrush chromosome

Lampbrush chromosomes are a special form of chromosome found in the growing oocytes (immature eggs) of most animals, except mammals. They were first described by Walther Flemming in 1882 in salamander oocytes. A decade later, Johannes Rückert observed similar structures in shark oocytes; his description of them as resembling a kerosene lamp chimney brush (Lampencylinderputzer) gave rise to the term "lampbrush". Lampbrush chromosomes of tailed and tailless amphibians, birds and insects are described best of all. Chromosomes transform into the lampbrush form during the diplotene stage of meiotic prophase I due to an active transcription of many genes. They are highly extended meiotic half-bivalents, each consisting of two sister chromatids. Lampbrush chromosomes are clearly visible even in the light microscope, where they are seen to be organized into a series of chromomeres with large chromatin loops extended laterally. Continuous RNA transcription is required to maintain typical chromomere-loop structure of lampbrush chromosomes. Inhibition of transcription leads to retraction of lateral loops into chromomeres and chromosome condensation.

Lampbrush chromosomes produce a large number of mRNAs and non-coding RNAs, which are synthesized on the lateral loops. These transcripts are used during oogenesis and at the early stages of embryogenesis. Each lateral loop contains one or several transcription units with polarized RNP-matrix coating the DNA axis of the loop.

Amphibian and avian lampbrush chromosomes can be microsurgically isolated from oocyte nuclei (germinal vesicle) with either forceps or needles. Giant chromosomes in the lampbrush form are useful model for studying chromosome organization, genome function and gene expression during meiotic prophase, since they allow the individual transcription units to be visualized. Moreover, lampbrush chromosomes are widely used for high-resolution mapping of DNA sequences and construction of detail cytological maps of individual chromosomes.
