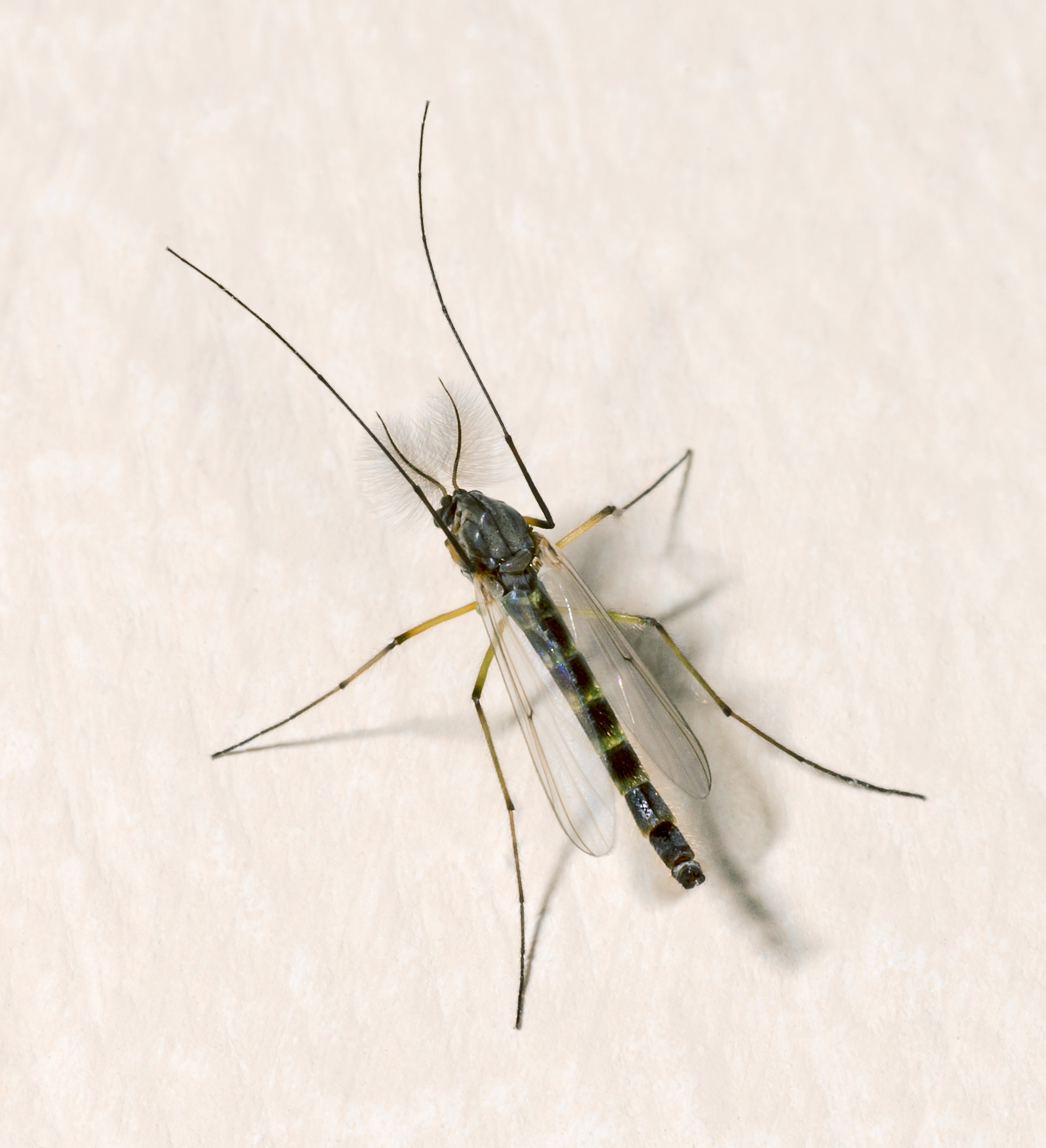
- Adult male

Scientific classification
- Kingdom: Animalia
- Phylum: Arthropoda
- Class: Insecta
- Order: Diptera
- Family: Chironomidae
- Genus: Chironomus
- Species: C. plumosus

Binomial name
- Chironomus plumosus (Linnaeus, 1758)

Synonyms
- Chironomus annularis De Geer, 1776; Chironomus ferrugineovittatus Zetterstedt, 1850; Chironomus hebescens Walker, 1856; Tipula plumosa Linnaeus, 1758

= Chironomus plumosus =

Species of fly

Chironomus plumosus, also known as the buzzer midge, is a species of nonbiting midge (Chironomidae) that occurs throughout areas in the Northern Hemisphere.

== Description ==
=== Adult ===
Adults are pale green with brown legs and grow to 12 mm (0.5 in). Males have feathery antennae, while females' antennae are sleek. A dark brown band is seen at the end of each abdominal segment. Adults of the sibling species C. muratensis and C. nudiventris cannot be distinguished from C. plumosus based on morphological characters.

=== Immature ===
The larvae are called bloodworms because some larvae are bright red, but they can also be found in brown and almost black. When the larva pupate, they drift towards the surface, making them vulnerable to many types of fish. Other common predators include the common backswimmer (Notonecta glauca), common pondskater (Gerris lacustris), common toad (Bufo bufo), lesser water boatman (Corixa punctata), dragonflies, damselflies, great crested newt (Triturus cristatus), great diving beetle (Dytiscus marginalis), redstart (Phoenicurus phoenicurus), smooth newt (Triturus vulgaris), water scorpion (Nepa cinerea) and other midges such as Anatopynia plumipes.

== Lifecycle ==
During the spring and summer, males create mating swarms which people can find quite a nuisance, though adults do not bite or feed. Females lay egg masses in water where the egg mass will grow and sink to the bottom. The larvae stay at the bottom in silken tubes. The larvae feed on organic material such as organic debris and algae.

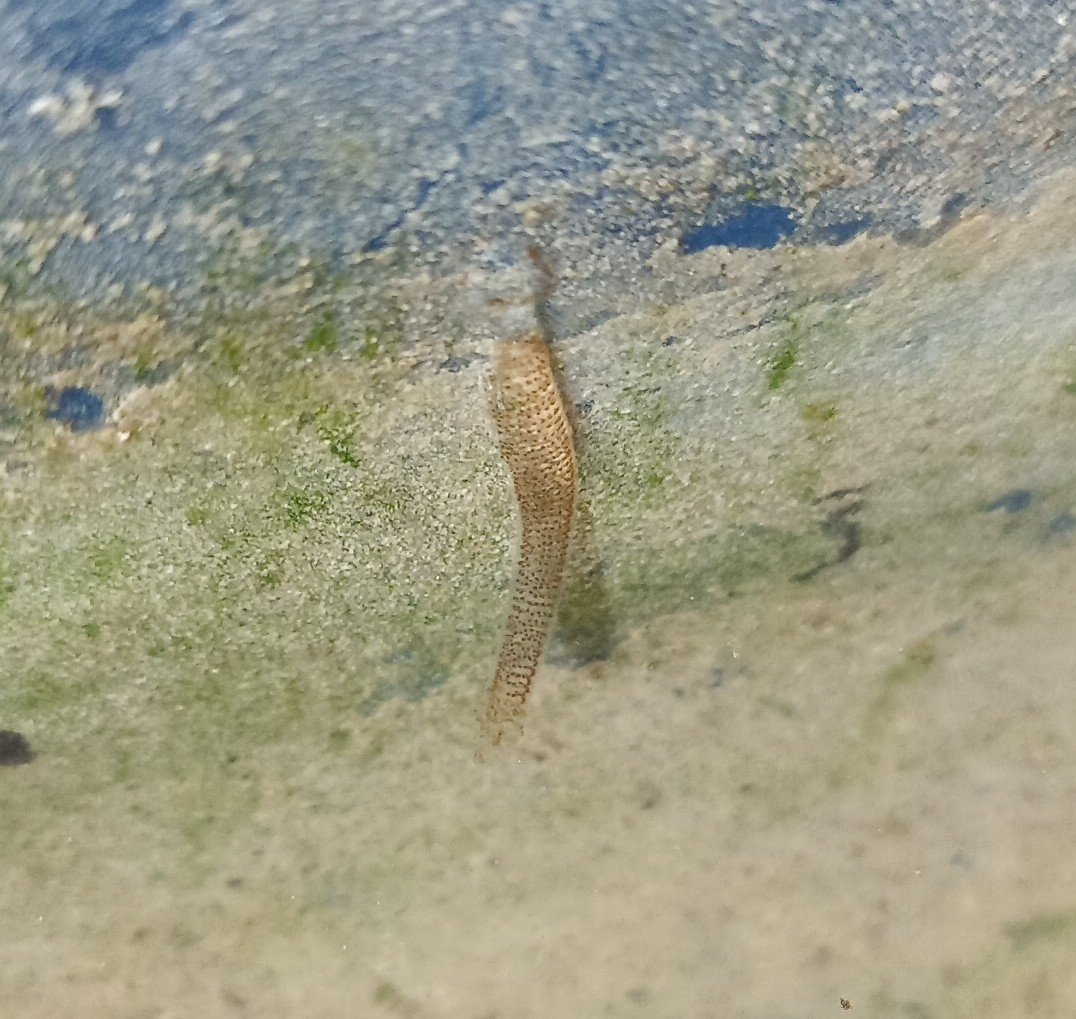
Egg mass laid by Chironomus plumosus
