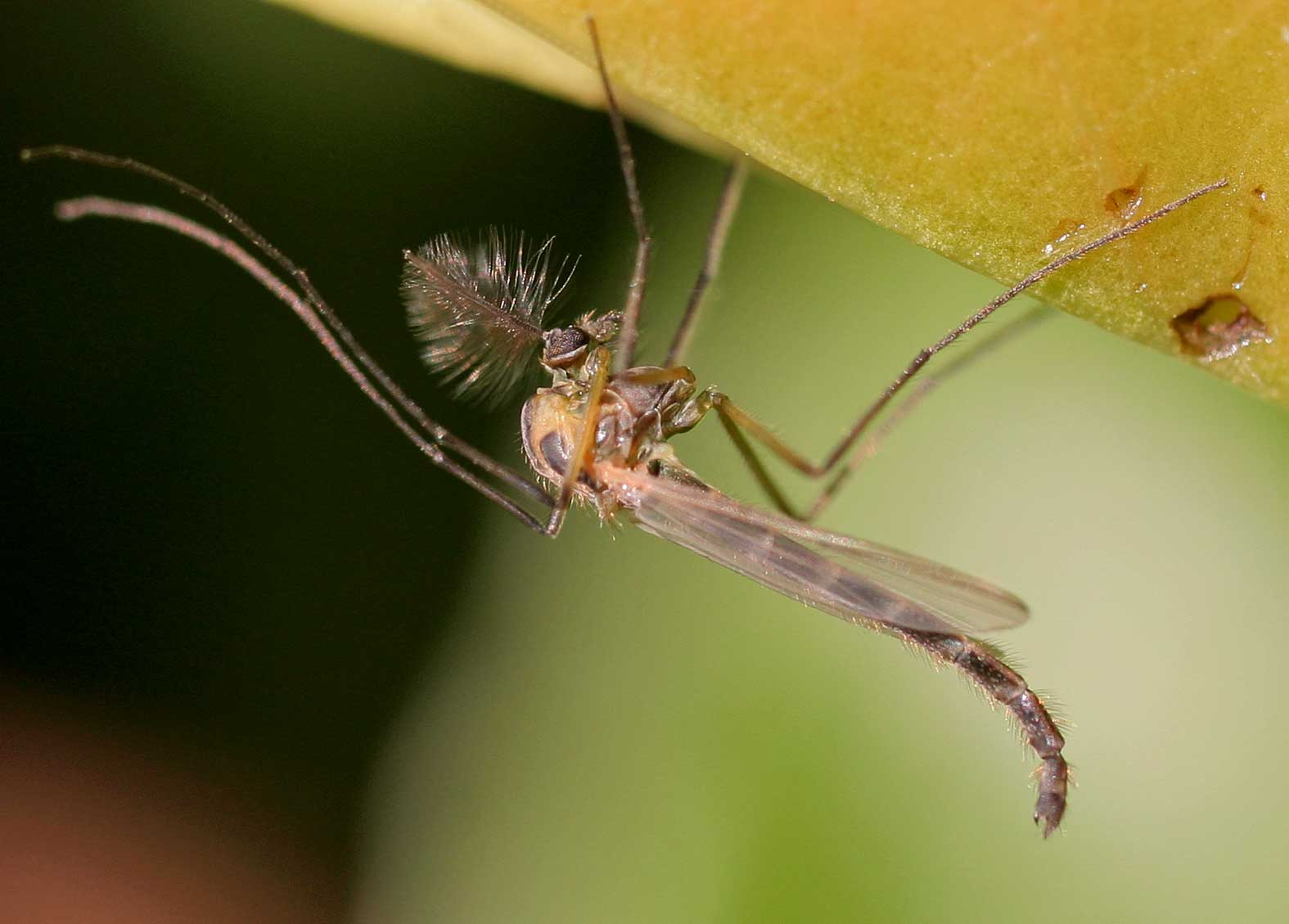
- Chironomus plumosus adult male

Scientific classification
- Kingdom: Animalia
- Phylum: Arthropoda
- Clade: Pancrustacea
- Class: Insecta
- Order: Diptera
- Family: Chironomidae
- Tribe: Chironomini
- Genus: Chironomus; Meigen, 1803

Type species
- Chironomus plumosus (Linnaeus, 1758)

Diversity
- at least 640 species

Synonyms
- Chaetolabis Townes, 1945; Cheironomus Wollaston, 1858; Chioronomus Wiedemann, 1817; Holtedahlia Kieffer, 1922; Limnochironomus Kieffer, 1922; Lobochironomus Ryser, Scholl & Wülker, 1985; Tendipes Meigen, 1800

= Chironomus =

Genus of flies

Chironomus is a genus of nonbiting midges in the subfamily Chironominae of the bloodworm family, Chironomidae, containing several cryptic species that can only be distinguished by experts based on the characteristics of their giant chromosomes.

In the early 20th century the name Tendipes Meigen, 1800 was often used instead. In 1963 the International Commission on Zoological Nomenclature restored the traditional name Chironomus, which was first published in 1803 by Johann Wilhelm Meigen.

== Description ==
Adult Chironomus are midges with the pronotum widest in the middle and bearing a notch, the head usually bearing a pair of small tubercles above the antennal bases, the antennal flagellum of males having 11 segments, and the male genitalia has inferior volsella large and larger than superior volsella. They range from 5 to 13 mm in length. Larvae are red and usually have tubes on the side or bottom of the eighth abdominal segment. These features are not unique to Chironomus, also being found in some related genera.

Adult males can be distinguished from females by their feather-like antennae.

== Behaviour ==
When at rest, adults often raise their front legs and vibrate them. This is the source of the genus name, which is derived from "cheironomos" (Greek for "one who moves the hands").

== Habitat ==
Larvae of Chironomus usually live in aquatic sediment. Those of the C. decorus group, C. riparius group and C. stigmaterus generally live in conditions of high nutrients and low oxygen. There are also Chironomus that live in relatively clean water.

The larvae of several species inhabit the profundal zone where they can reach relatively high densities. They use a combination of hemoglobin-like proteins and undulatory movements in their burrows to obtain oxygen in poorly oxygenated habitats.

== Health problems caused ==
Fine dust from adult chironomids has been implicated as an allergen causing asthma, in Japan.

== See also ==
- List of Chironomus species

== Gallery ==
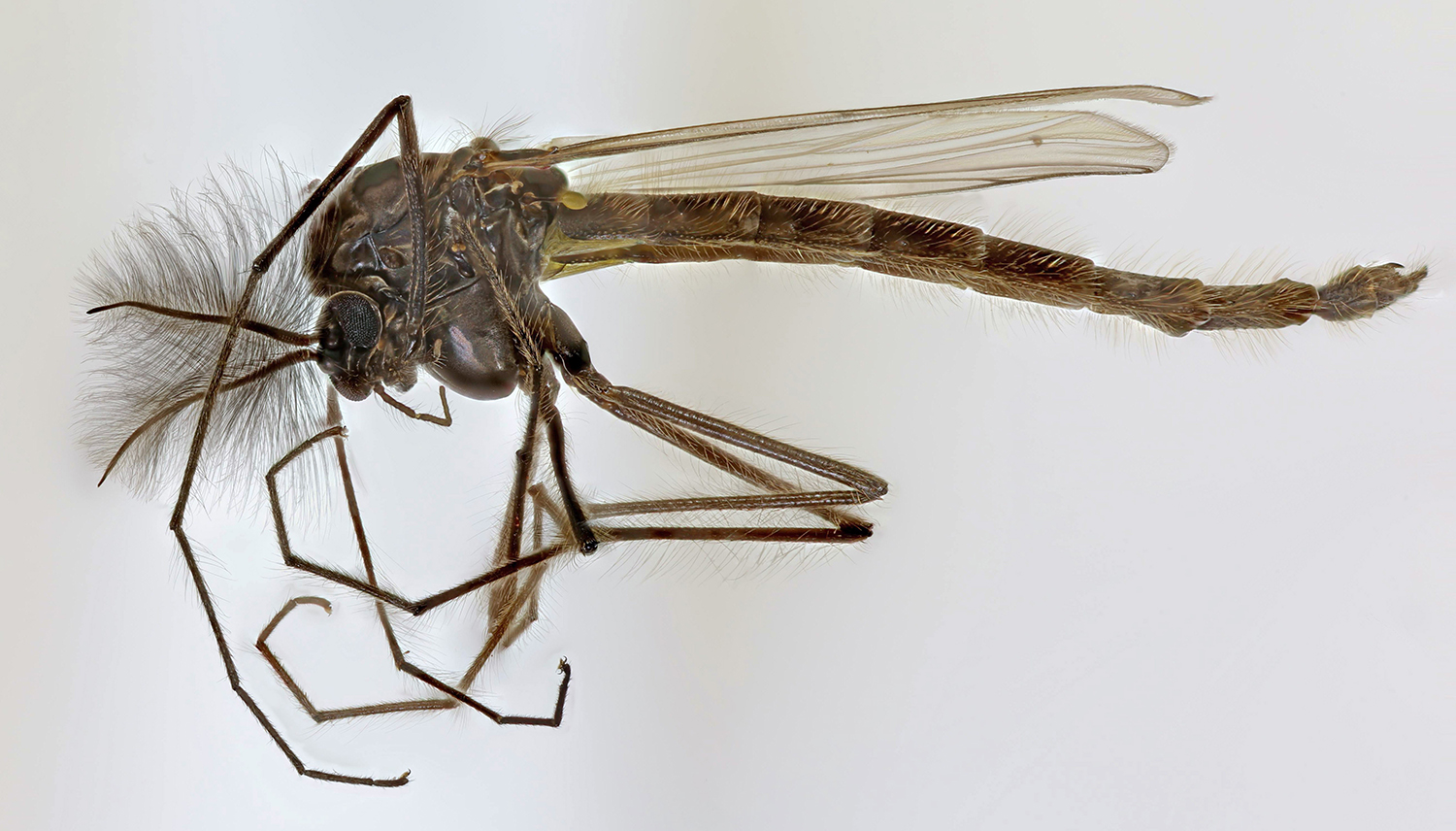
Chironomus anthracinus

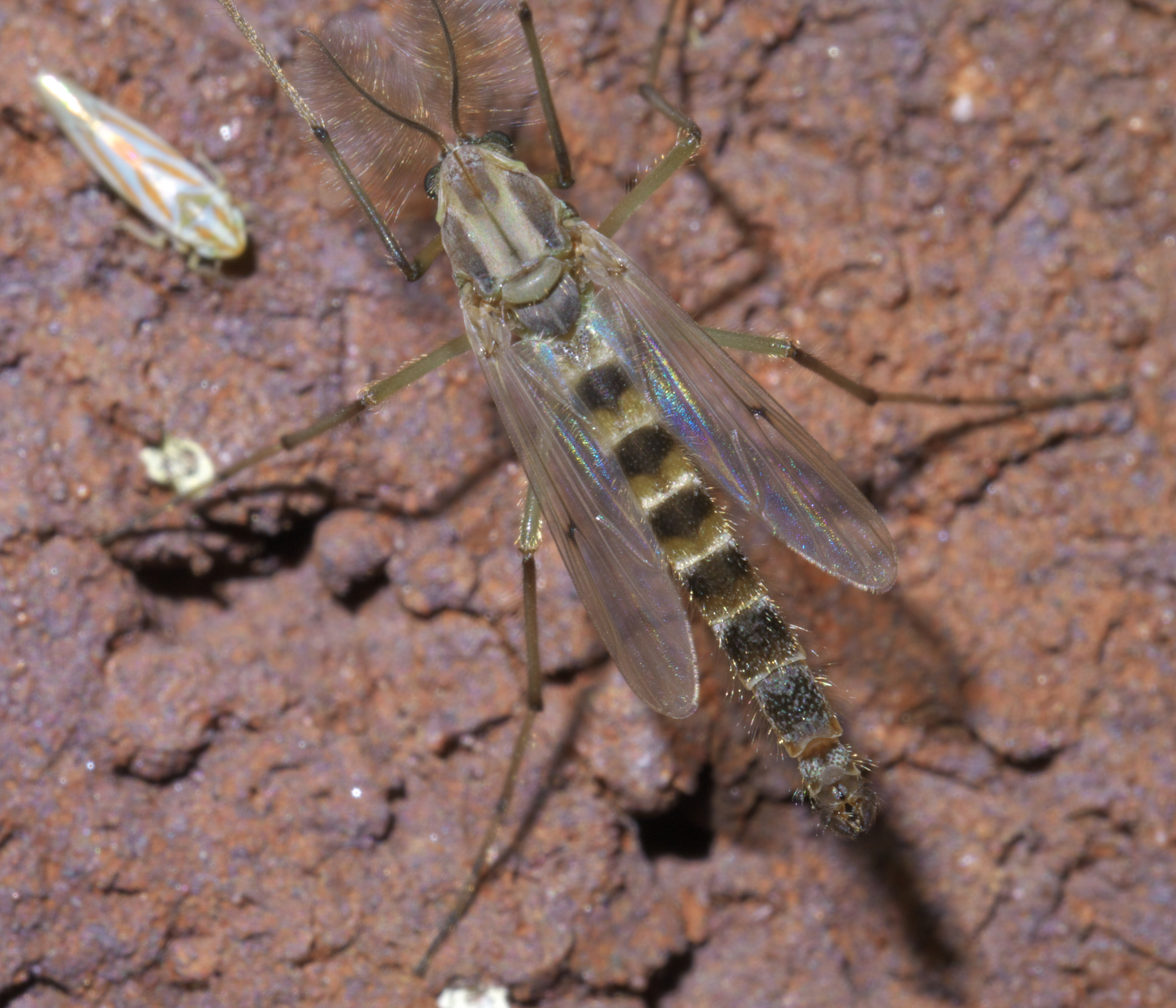
Chironomus crassicaudatus

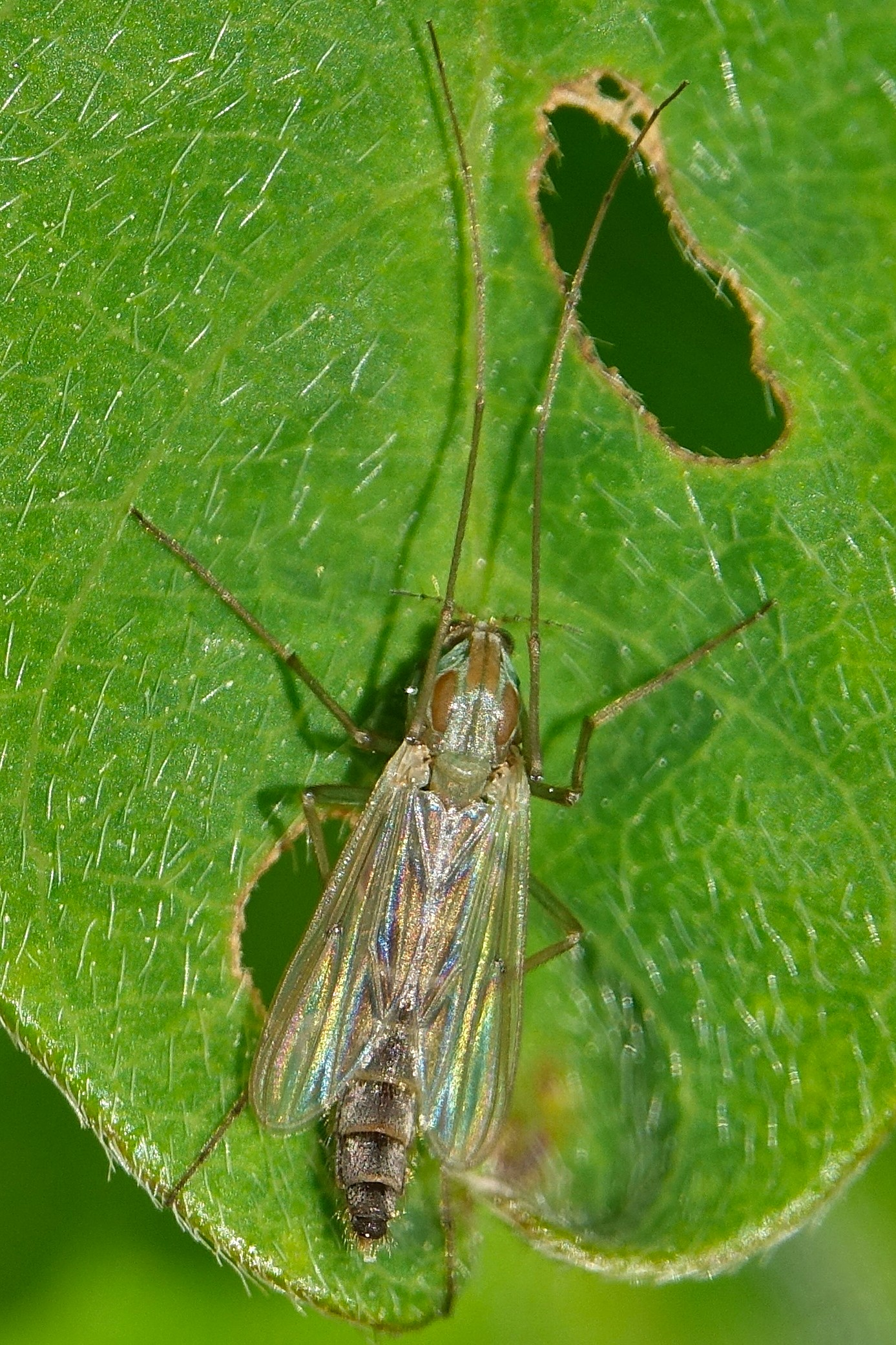
Chironomus yoshimatsui

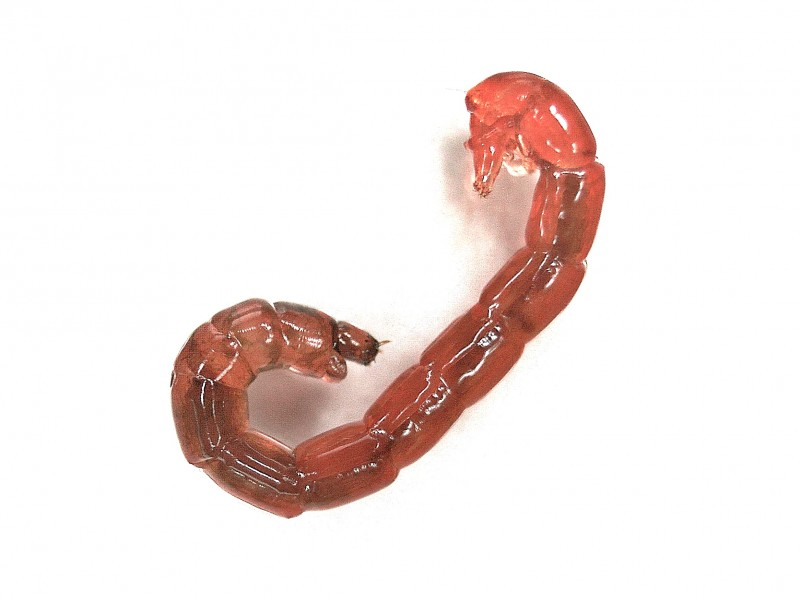
Chironomus sp. larva
