= INH1 =

Names
- Preferred IUPAC name N-[4-(2,4-Dimethylphenyl)-1,3-thiazol-2-yl]benzamide

Identifiers
CAS Number	313553-47-8
3D model (JSmol)	Interactive image
ChemSpider	832319
PubChem CID	959043
CompTox Dashboard (EPA)	DTXSID80745407
- InChI: InChI=1S/C18H16N2OS/c1-12-8-9-15(13(2)10-12)16-11-22-18(19-16)20-17(21)14-6-4-3-5-7-14/h3-11H,1-2H3,(H,19,20,21) Key: JPMOKRWIYQGMJL-UHFFFAOYSA-N; InChI=1/C18H16N2OS/c1-12-8-9-15(13(2)10-12)16-11-22-18(19-16)20-17(21)14-6-4-3-5-7-14/h3-11H,1-2H3,(H,19,20,21) Key: JPMOKRWIYQGMJL-UHFFFAOYAG
- SMILES: CC1=CC(=C(C=C1)C2=CSC(=N2)NC(=O)C3=CC=CC=C3)C

Properties
Chemical formula	C_{18}H_{16}N_{2}OS
Molar mass	308.40 g·mol^{−1}
Density	1.2±0.1 g/cm^{3}
- Except where otherwise noted, data are given for materials in their standard state (at 25 °C [77 °F], 100 kPa). Infobox references

INH1, a thiazolyl benzamide compound, is a cell-permeable Hec1/Nek2 mitotic pathway inhibitor I.

== Biological activity ==
INH1 controls the biological activity of Hec1/Nek2 mitotic pathway. It specifically disrupts the Hec1/Nek2 interaction by directly binding to Hec1, resulting in defective Hec1 kinetochores localization and low-level cellular Nek2 protein. INH1 induces a transient mitotic arrest, exhibiting metaphase chromosome misalignment, spindle abnormality, and consequently cancer cell apoptosis.

Experiments show that INH1 potently inhibits the proliferation of multiple human breast cancer cell lines, cervical HeLa cells, and colon cancer cells in vitro.
