= Protein filament =

Long chain of protein monomers

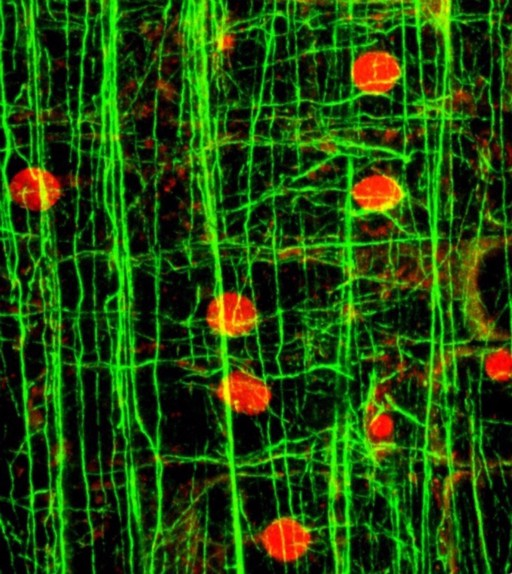
Developing wood cells in poplar showing microfilaments (in green) and cell nuclei (in red)

In biology, a protein filament is a long chain of protein monomers, such as those found in hair, muscle, or in flagella. Protein filaments form together to make the cytoskeleton of the cell. They are often bundled together to provide support, strength, and rigidity to the cell. When the filaments are packed up together, they are able to form three different cellular parts. The three major classes of protein filaments that make up the cytoskeleton include: actin filaments, microtubules and intermediate filaments.

== Cellular types ==
=== Microfilaments ===
Compared to the other parts of the cytoskeletons, the microfilaments contain the thinnest filaments, with a diameter of approximately 7 nm. Microfilaments are part of the cytoskeleton that are composed of protein called actin. Two strands of actin intertwined together form a filamentous structure allowing for the movement of motor proteins. Microfilaments can either occur in the monomeric G-actin or filamentous F-actin. Microfilaments are important when it comes to the overall organization of the plasma membrane. Actin filaments are considered to be both helical and flexible. They are composed of several actin monomers chained together which add to their flexibility. They are found in several places in the body including the microvilli, contractile rings, stress fibers, cellular cortex, etc. In a contractile ring, actin have the ability to help with cellular division while in the cellular cortex they can help with the structural integrity of the cell.

Microfilament Polymerization

Microfilament polymerization is divided into three steps. The nucleation step is the first step, and it is the rate limiting and slowest step of the process. Elongation is the next step in this process, and it is the rapid addition of actin monomers at both the plus and minus end of the microfilament. The final step is the steady state. At this state the addition of monomers will equal the subtraction of monomers causing the microfilament to no longer grow. This is known as the critical concentration of actin. There are several toxins that have been known to limit the polymerization of actin. Cytochalasin is a toxin that will bind to the actin polymer, so it can no longer bind to the incoming actin monomers. Actin originally attached in the polymer is still leaving the microfilament causing depolymerization. Phalloidin is a toxin that will bind to actin locking the filament in place. Monomers are neither adding or leaving this polymer which causes the stabilization of the molecule. Latrunculin is similar to cytochalasin, but it is a toxin which will bind to the actin monomers preventing it from adding onto the actin polymer. This will cause the depolymerization of the actin polymer in the cell.

Actin Based Motor Protein- Myosin

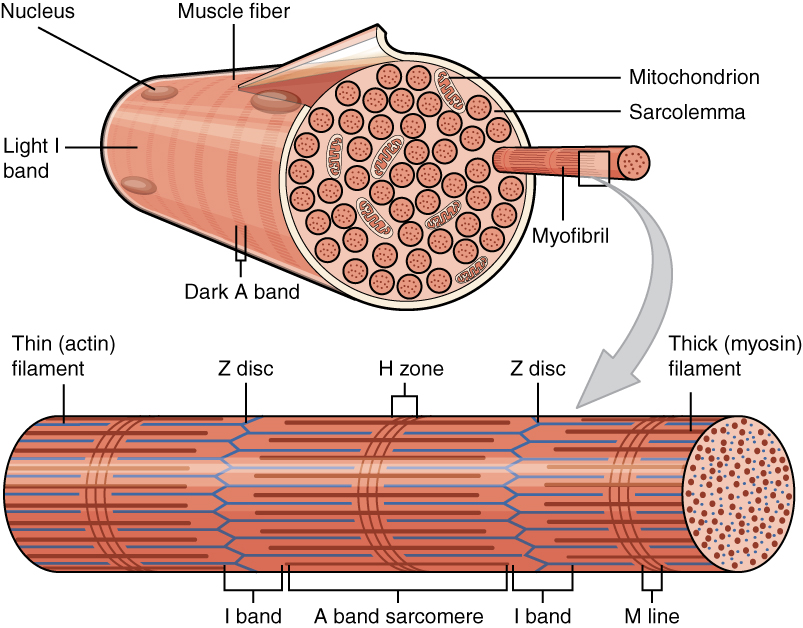
This is a representation of a microfilament breakdown in a muscle fiber. It shows the different zones and disks within the sarcolemma of this muscle fiber.

There are several different proteins that interact with actin in the body. However, one of the most famous types of motor proteins is myosin. Myosin will bind to these actins causing the movement of actin. This movement of myosin along the microfilament can cause muscle contraction, membrane association, endocytosis, and organelle transport. The actin microfilament is composed of three bands and one disk. The A band is the part of the actin that will bind to the myosin during muscle contraction. The I band is the part of the actin that is not bound to the myosin, but it will still move during muscle contraction. The H zone is the space in between two adjacent actin that will shrink when the muscle begins to contract. The Z disk is the part of the microfilament that characterizes the overall end of each side of the sarcomere, a structural unit of a myofibril.

Proteins Limiting Microfilaments

These microfilaments have the potential to be limited by several factors or proteins. Tropomodulin is a protein that will cap the ends of the actin filaments causing the overall stability of the structure. Nebulin is another protein that can bind to the sides of the actin preventing the attachment of myosin to them. This causes stabilization of the actin limiting muscle contraction. Titin is another protein, but it binds to the myosin rather than the actin microfilament. Titin will help stabilize the contraction and myosin-actin structure.

=== Microtubules ===
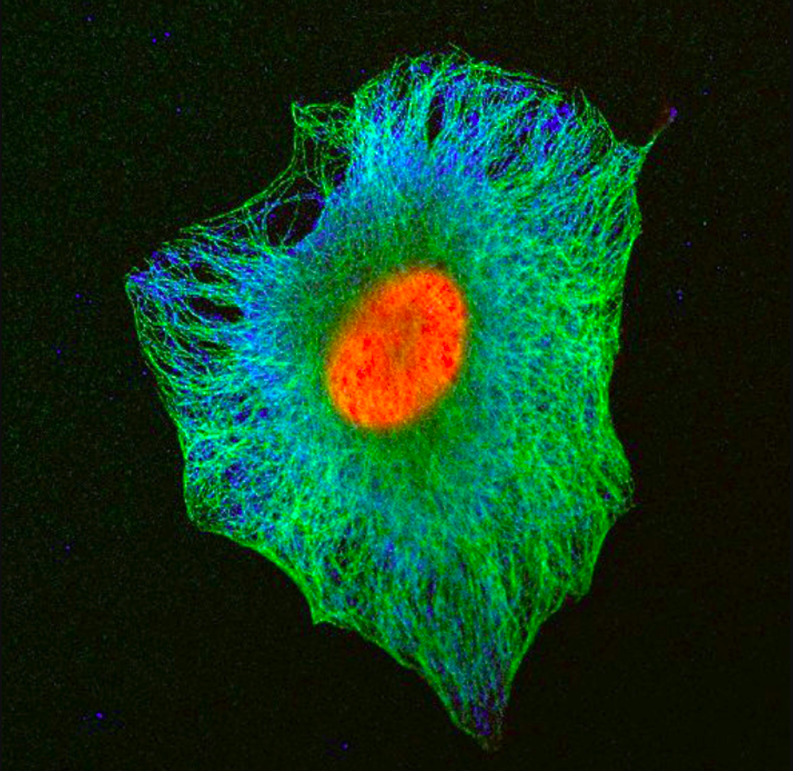
A human cell showing the tubulin component of the cytoskeleton in green and the nucleus in red. The blue staining is a single cytoplasmic protein.

Microtubules are the largest type of filament, with a diameter of 25 nm wide, in the cytoskeleton. A single microtubule consists of 13 linear microfilaments. Unlike microfilaments, microtubules are composed of a protein called tubulin. The tubulin consists of dimers, named either "αβ-tubulin" or "tubulin dimers", which polymerize to form the microtubules. These microtubules are structurally quantified into three main groups: singlets, doublets, and triplets. Singlets are microtubule structures that are known to be found in the cytoplasm. Doublets are structures found in the cilia and flagella. Triplets are found in the basal bodies and centrioles. There are two main populations of these microtubules. There are unstable short-lived microtubules that will assemble and disassemble rapidly. The other population are stable long-lived microtubules. These microtubules will remain polymerized for longer periods of time and can be found in flagella, red blood cells, and nerve cells. Microtubules have the ability to play a significant role in the organization of organelles and vesicles, beating of cilia and flagella, nerve and red blood cell structure, and alignment/ separation of chromosomes during mitosis and meiosis.

Orientation in Cells

When a cell is in the interphase process, microtubules tend to all orient the same way. Their negatively charged end will be close to the nucleus of the cell, while their positively end will be oriented away from the cell body. The basal body found within the cell helps the microtubule to orient in this specific fashion. In mitotic cells, they will see similar orientation as the positively charged end will be orientated away from the cell while the negatively charged end will be towards the Microtubule Organizing Center (MTOC). The positive end of these microtubules will attach to the kinetochore on the chromosome allowing for cellular division when applicable. Nerve cells tend to be a different from these other two forms of orientation. In an axon nerve cell, microtubules will arrange with their negatively charged end toward the cell body and positively charged end away from the cell body. However, in dendrites, microtubules can have a different orientation. In dendrites, microtubules can have their positively charged end toward the cell body, but their negatively charged end will likely be away from the cell body.

Drugs Disrupting Microtubules

Colchicine is an example of a drug that has been known to be used as a microtubule inhibitor. It binds to both the α and β tubulin on dimers in microtubules. At low concentrations this can cause stabilization of microtubules, but at high concentrations it can lead to depolymerization of microtubules. Taxol is another drug oftentimes used to help treat breast cancer through targeting microtubules. Taxol binds to the side of a tubule and can lead to disruption in cell division.

Role in Cellular Division

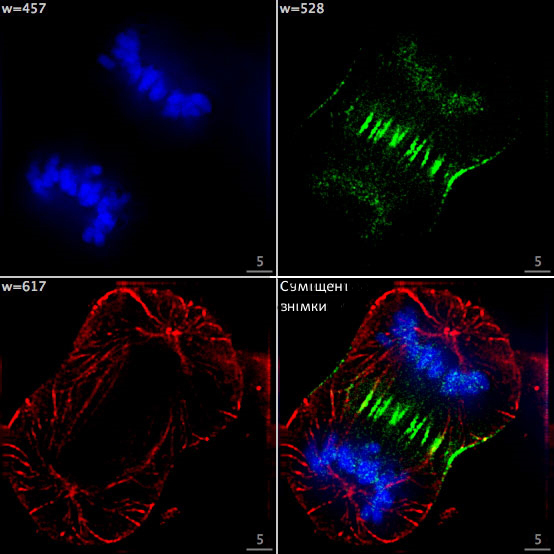
This helps depict the role that microtubules play in cellular division. In this fluorescent image, the microtubules are highlighted green and can be seen helping to pull the cells apart.

There are three main type of microtubules involved with cellular division. Astral microtubules are those extending out of the centrosome toward the cell cortex. They can connect to the plasma membrane via cortical landmark deposits. These deposits are determined via polarity cues, growth and differentiation factors, or adhesion contacts. Polar microtubules will extend toward the middle of the cell and overlap the equator where the cell is dividing. Kinetochore microtubules will extend and bind to the kinetochore on the chromosomes assisting in the division of a cell. These microtubules will attach to the kinetochore at their positive end. NDC80 is a protein found at this binding point that will help with the stabilization of this interaction during cellular division. During the cellular division process, the overall microtubule length will not change. It will however produce a tread-milling effect that can cause the separation of these chromosomes.

=== Intermediate filaments ===
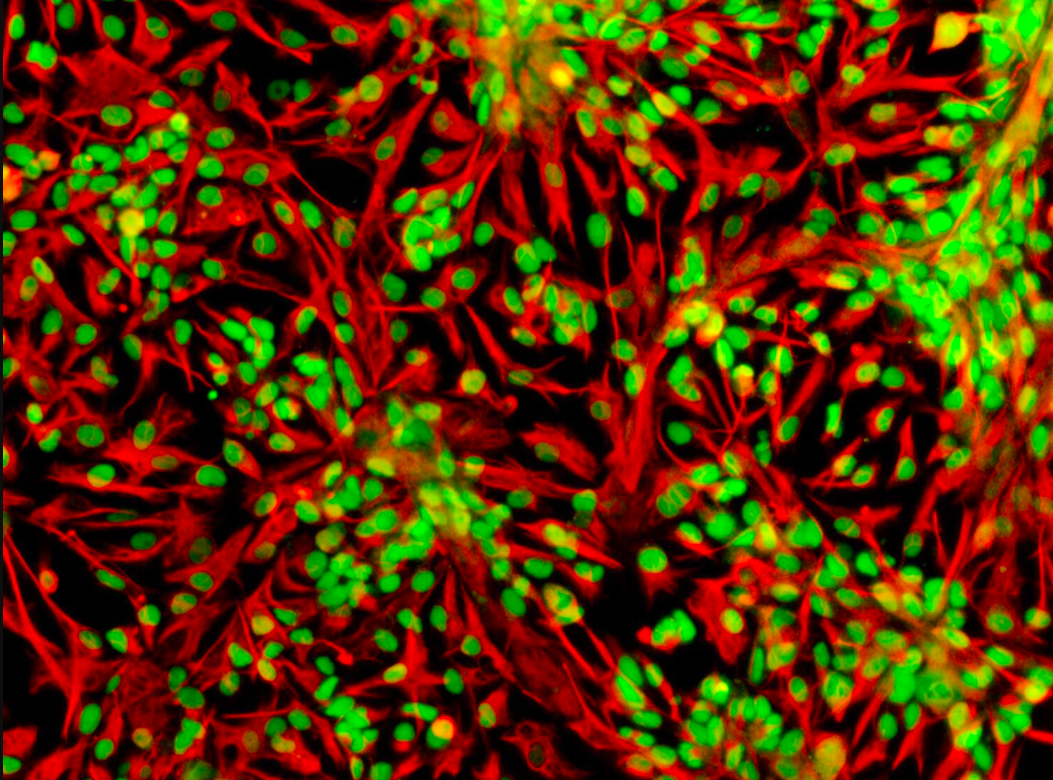
Human neural stem cells stained for Sox2, in green, and vimentin, in red. Vimentin is a type III intermediate filament (IF) protein.

Intermediate filaments are part of the cytoskeleton structure found in most eukaryotic cells. An example of an intermediate filament is a neurofilament. They provide support for the structure of the axon and are a major part of the cytoskeleton. Intermediate filaments contain an average diameter of 10 nm, which is smaller than that of microtubules, but larger than that of microfilaments. These 10 nm filaments are made up of polypeptide chains, which belong to the same family as intermediate filaments. Intermediate filaments are not involved with the direct movement of cells unlike microtubules and microfilaments. Intermediate filaments can play a role in cell communication in a process known as crosstalk. This cross talk has the potential to help with the mechanosensing. This mechanosensing can help protect the cell during cellular migration within the body. They can also help with the linkage of actin and microtubules to the cytoskeleton which will lead to the eventual movement and division of cells. Lastly these intermediate filaments have the ability to help with vascular permeability through organizing continuous adherens junctions through plectin cross-linking.

Classification of Intermediate Filaments

Intermediate filaments are composed of several proteins unlike microfilaments and microtubules which are composed of primarily actin and tubulin. These proteins have been classified into 6 major categories based on their similar characteristics. Type I and II intermediate filaments are those that are composed of keratins, and they are mainly found in epithelial cells. Type III intermediate filaments contain vimentin. They can be found in a variety of cells which include smooth muscle cells, fibroblasts, and white blood cells. Type IV intermediate filaments are the neurofilaments found in neurons. They can be found in many different motor axons supporting these cells. Type V intermediate filaments are composed of nuclear lamins which can be found in the nuclear envelope of many eukaryotic cells. They will help to assemble an orthogonal network in these cells in the nuclear membrane. Type VI intermediate filaments are involved with nestin that interact with the stem cells of central nervous system.
