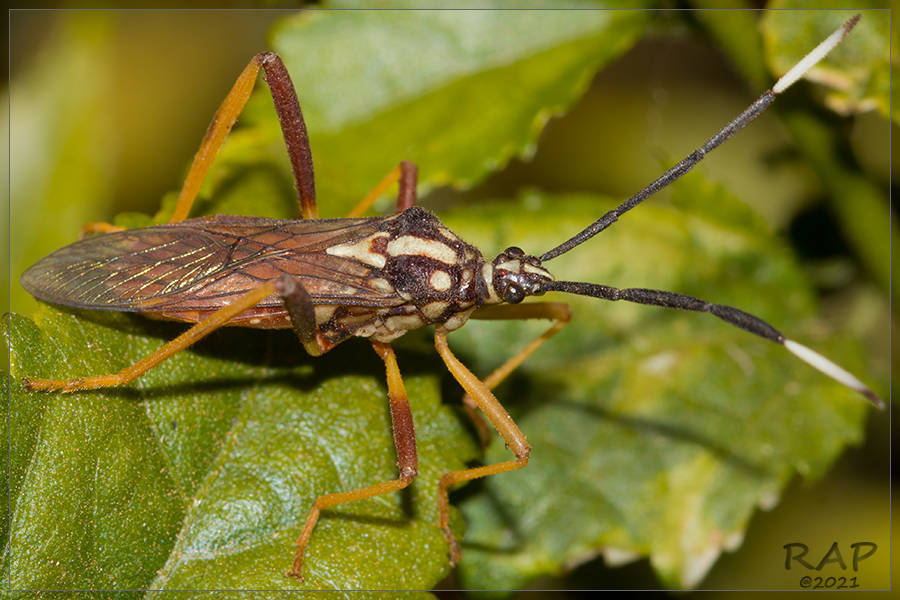

Scientific classification
- Kingdom: Animalia
- Phylum: Arthropoda
- Class: Insecta
- Order: Hemiptera
- Suborder: Heteroptera
- Family: Coreidae
- Genus: Holhymenia
- Species: H. histrio

Binomial name
- Holhymenia histrio (Fabricius, 1803)

Synonyms
- Holhymenia hystrio Pennington, 1922; Copius scurra Burmeister, 1835; Cimex verticalis Reich, 1795

= Holhymenia histrio =

Species of insect

Holhymenia histrio, its Spanish common name being chinche del Mburucuyá, also called the Mburucyá bug, passion fruit bug, or squash bug, is a species of leaf-footed bug found across Mexico and South America.

== Description ==
Adults have black heads and a thorax with yellowish-white spots and a dark brown abdomen with black spots and bands. The forelegs are a solid yellow. The femurs on its two hind legs are an auburn brown while its tibia and taurus are colored yellow. Its forewings are transparent with well-marked brown venation. Antennae are a dark brown or black with a white segment at the forefront.

Adult Mburucyá bugs mimic the colors and body structure of ichneumonid wasps, which is an example of Batesian mimicry.

There are no visual or identifiable differences between sexes.

== Habitat ==
Holhymenia histrio is most common throughout South America, most notably in Argentina and Brazil. They often populate areas with large amounts of agriculture.

== Lifecycle ==
The eggs of the H. histrio are dark brown and elliptical in shape.

Nymphs are different depending on stage. Anatomically, they are similar in structure to adults, however they lack functional wings, which develop fully in adulthood. Nymphs can additionally be differentiated from adults by coloring. In the H. histrio nymph stage, the antennae, head, part of the thorax, and legs are a dark red, and the abdomen is light green. In the next life stage, the body turns light green with a black head, antennae, and legs. In the last nymphal stage, the body is light brown with creamy-yellow edges. Their legs are the same yellow but with black rings on its femurs and tibias.

They are prone to predation by birds and insects.

=== Behavior ===
While adult H. histrio are solitary, nymphs may more commonly be found with others of the same species. The H. histrio are capable of flight.

Plant damage can be seen after H. histrio feeds from the fluids in its leaves, stems, and fruits. Over time, this can lead to the plant wilting or yellowing. They commonly feed on plants of the Passiflora genus (Phytophagous). Due to their destructive feeding habits, they are often viewed as pests. While they may negatively affect local plant life, they are not known to harm humans or animals.

The adults are solitary, while nymphs are sociable.

Copulation lasts a long time so they might be found feeding during the mating process.

H. histrio, like many members of the Coreidae family, are capable of stridulation.

== Scientific Relevance ==
A study of the chromosomes of the H. histrio was conducted to examine the properties of their satellite DNA. The species has holocentric chromosomes, with which the observed satellite DNA was selected from.

From genomes selected from male and female specimens, multiple satellite DNA families were identified. Satellite families were identified based on similar structure and categorized through the use of a program. One satellite DNA had been the most prevalent of the different satellite DNA recorded. In comparison to species with monocentric chromosomes, the proportion of the most prevalent genome is less abundant than the second greatest number of genomes. The general evolution of the H. histrio genome appears to be similar to that of monocentric insect species.
