= Centromere protein H =

Protein found in humans

CENPH

Identifiers
- Aliases: CENPH, centromere protein H
- External IDs: OMIM: 605607; MGI: 1349448; GeneCards: CENPH

Gene location (Human)
Chr.	Chromosome 5 (human)
Band	5q13.2	Start	69,189,574 bp
Band	5q13.2	End	69,210,357 bp

Gene location (Mouse)
Chr.	Chromosome 13 (mouse)
Band	13 53.23 cM|13 D1	Start	100,759,674 bp
Band	13 53.23 cM|13 D1	End	100,775,899 bp
RNA expression pattern
Bgee	Human / Mouse (ortholog); Top expressed in: gonad; ventricular zone; ganglionic eminence; oocyte; right testis; testicle; left testis; secondary oocyte; bone marrow; Achilles tendon / Top expressed in: zygote; yolk sac; tail of embryo; secondary oocyte; genital tubercle; embryo; epiblast; embryo; abdominal wall; mandibular prominence; More reference expression data
BioGPS	n/a
Gene ontology
Molecular function	kinetochore binding; protein binding
Cellular component	chromosome; cytosol; chromosome, centromeric region; nucleus; kinetochore; nucleoplasm; nucleolus
Biological process	kinetochore assembly; kinetochore organization; CENP-A containing chromatin assembly
Sources:Amigo / QuickGO
Orthologs
Databases	NCBI: entry; OMA: entry
Species	Human	Mouse
Entrez	64946	26886
Ensembl	ENSG00000153044	ENSMUSG00000045273
UniProt	Q9H3R5	Q9QYM8
RefSeq (mRNA)	NM_022909	NM_021886
RefSeq (protein)	NP_075060	NP_068686; NP_001386457
Location (UCSC)	Chr 5: 69.19 – 69.21 Mb	Chr 13: 100.76 – 100.78 Mb
PubMed search
- Wikidata
View/Edit Human	View/Edit Mouse

CENP-H

Identifiers
- Symbol: CENP-H
- Pfam: PF05837
- InterPro: IPR008426
Available protein structures:
- PDB: IPR008426 PF05837 (ECOD; PDBsum)
- AlphaFold: IPR008426; PF05837

Centromere protein H is a protein that in humans is encoded by the CENPH gene. It is involved in the assembly of kinetochore proteins, mitotic progression and chromosome segregation.

== Function ==
Centromere and kinetochore proteins play a critical role in centromere structure, kinetochore formation, and sister chromatid separation. The protein encoded by this gene colocalizes with inner kinetochore plate proteins CENP-A and CENP-C in both interphase and metaphase. CENP-H is required for the localisation of CENP-C, but not CENP-A, to the centromere. However, it may be involved in the incorporation of newly synthesised CENP-A into centromeres via its interaction with the CENP-A/CENP-HI complex. CENP-H localizes outside of centromeric heterochromatin, where CENP-B is localized, and inside the kinetochore corona, where CENP-E is localized during prometaphase. It is thought that this protein can bind to itself, as well as to CENP-A, CENP-B or CENP-C. Multimers of the protein localize constitutively to the inner kinetochore plate and play an important role in the organization and function of the active centromere-kinetochore complex. CENP-H contains a coiled-coil structure and a nuclear localisation signal.

Studies show that CENP-H may be associated with certain human cancers.

CENP-H shows sequence similarity to the Schizosaccharomyces pombe kinetochore protein Fta3 which is a subunit of the Sim4 complex. This complex is required for loading the DASH complex onto the kinetochore via interaction with dad1. Fta2, Fta3 and Fta4 associate with the central core and inner repeat region of the centromere.

== Interactions ==
CENPH has also been shown to interact with KIAA0090. The significance of this interaction is unclear.
