= Kinetochore =

Protein complex that allows microtubules to attach to chromosomes during cell division

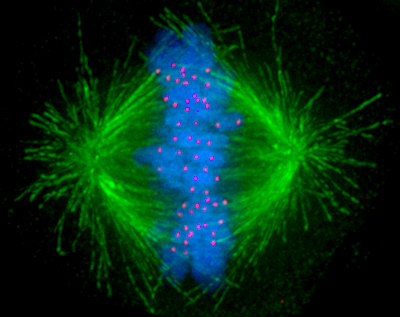
Image of kinetochores in pink

A kinetochore (/kɪˈnɛtəkɔːr/, /-ˈniːtəkɔːr/) is a flared oblique-shaped protein structure associated with duplicated chromatids in eukaryotic cells where the spindle fibers, which can be thought of as the ropes pulling chromosomes apart, attach during cell division to pull sister chromatids apart. The kinetochore assembles on the centromere and links the chromosome to microtubule polymers from the mitotic spindle during mitosis and meiosis. The term kinetochore was first used in a footnote in a 1934 Cytology book by Lester W. Sharp and commonly accepted in 1936. Sharp's footnote reads: "The convenient term kinetochore (= movement place) has been suggested to the author by J. A. Moore", likely referring to John Alexander Moore who had joined Columbia University as a freshman in 1932.

Monocentric organisms, including vertebrates, fungi, and most plants, have a single centromeric region on each chromosome which assembles a single, localized kinetochore. Holocentric organisms, such as nematodes and some plants, assemble a kinetochore along the entire length of a chromosome.

Kinetochores start, control, and supervise the striking movements of chromosomes during cell division. During mitosis, which occurs after the amount of DNA is doubled in each chromosome (while maintaining the same number of chromosomes) in S phase, two sister chromatids are held together by a centromere. Each chromatid has its own kinetochore, which face in opposite directions and attach to opposite poles of the mitotic spindle apparatus. Following the transition from metaphase to anaphase, the sister chromatids separate from each other, and the individual kinetochores on each chromatid drive their movement to the spindle poles that will define the two new daughter cells. The kinetochore is therefore essential for the chromosome segregation that is classically associated with mitosis and meiosis.

== Structure ==
The kinetochore contains two regions:

- an inner kinetochore, which is tightly associated with the centromere DNA and assembled in a specialized form of chromatin that persists throughout the cell cycle;
- an outer kinetochore, which interacts with microtubules; the outer kinetochore is a very dynamic structure with many identical components, which are assembled and functional only during cell division.

Even the simplest kinetochores consist of more than 19 different proteins. Many of these proteins are conserved between eukaryotic species, including a specialized histone H3 variant (called CENP-A or CenH3) which helps the kinetochore associate with DNA. Other proteins in the kinetochore adhere it to the microtubules (MTs) of the mitotic spindle. There are also motor proteins, including both dynein and kinesin, which generate forces that move chromosomes during mitosis. Other proteins, such as Mad2, monitor the microtubule attachment as well as the tension between sister kinetochores and activate the spindle checkpoint to arrest the cell cycle when either of these is absent. The actual set of genes essential for kinetochore function varies from one species to another.

Kinetochore functions include anchoring of chromosomes to MTs in the spindle, verification of anchoring, activation of the spindle checkpoint and participation in the generation of force to propel chromosome movement during cell division. On the other hand, microtubules are metastable polymers made of α- and β-tubulin, alternating between growing and shrinking phases, a phenomenon known as dynamic instability. MTs are highly dynamic structures, whose behavior is integrated with kinetochore function to control chromosome movement and segregation. It has also been reported that the kinetochore organization differs between mitosis and meiosis and the integrity of meiotic kinetochore is essential for meiosis specific events such as pairing of homologous chromosomes, sister kinetochore monoorientation, protection of centromeric cohesin and spindle-pole body cohesion and duplication.

=== In animal cells ===
The kinetochore is composed of several layers, observed initially by conventional fixation and staining methods of electron microscopy, (reviewed by C. Rieder in 1982) and more recently by rapid freezing and substitution.

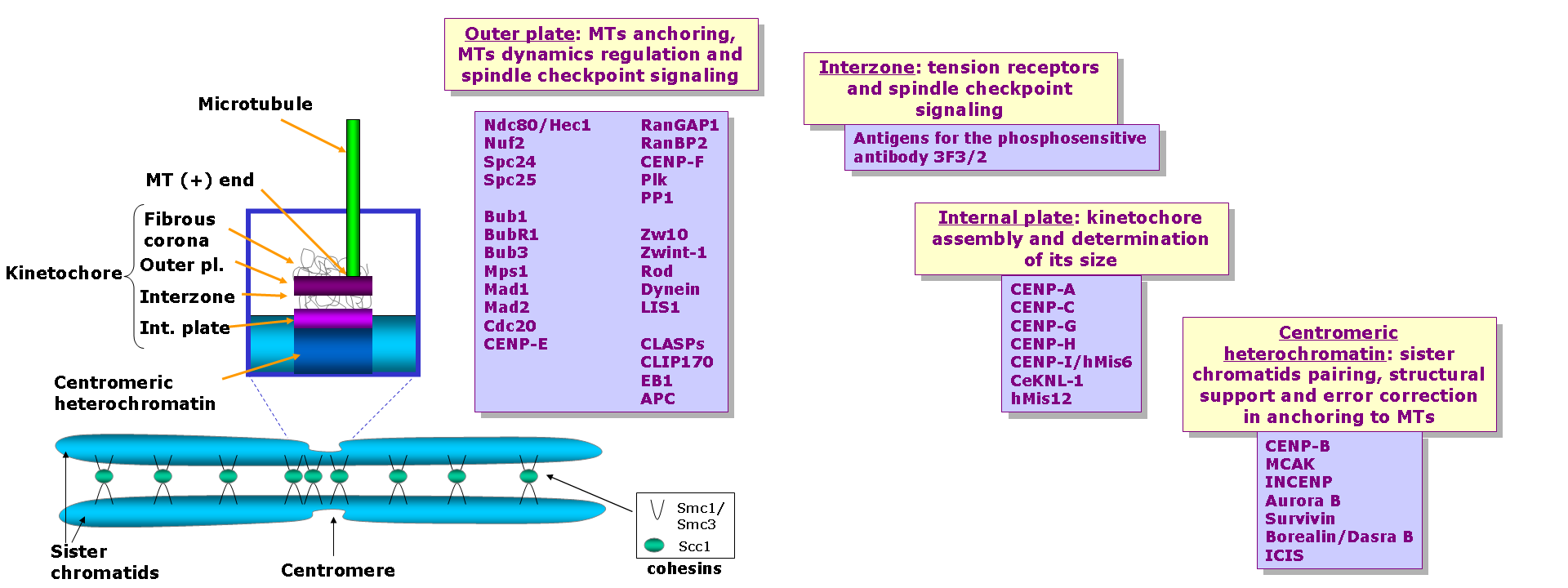
Kinetochore structure and components in vertebrate cells. Based on Maiato et al. (2004).

The deepest layer in the kinetochore is the inner plate, which is organized on a chromatin structure containing nucleosomes presenting a specialized histone (named CENP-A, which substitutes histone H3 in this region), auxiliary proteins, and DNA. DNA organization in the centromere (satellite DNA) is one of the least understood aspects of vertebrate kinetochores. The inner plate appears like a discrete heterochromatin domain throughout the cell cycle.

External to the inner plate is the outer plate, which is composed mostly of proteins. This structure is assembled on the surface of the chromosomes only after the nuclear envelope breaks down. The outer plate in vertebrate kinetochores contains about 20 anchoring sites for MTs (+) ends (named kMTs, after kinetochore MTs), whereas a kinetochore's outer plate in yeast (Saccharomyces cerevisiae) contains only one anchoring site.

The outermost domain in the kinetochore forms a fibrous corona, which can be visualized by conventional microscopy, yet only in the absence of MTs. This corona is formed by a dynamic network of resident and temporary proteins implicated in the spindle checkpoint, in microtubule anchoring, and in the regulation of chromosome behavior.

During mitosis, each sister chromatid forming the complete chromosome has its own kinetochore. Distinct sister kinetochores can be observed at first at the end of G2 phase in cultured mammalian cells. These early kinetochores show a mature laminar structure before the nuclear envelope breaks down. The molecular pathway for kinetochore assembly in higher eukaryotes has been studied using gene knockouts in mice and in cultured chicken cells, as well as using RNA interference (RNAi) in C. elegans, Drosophila and human cells, yet no simple linear route can describe the data obtained so far.

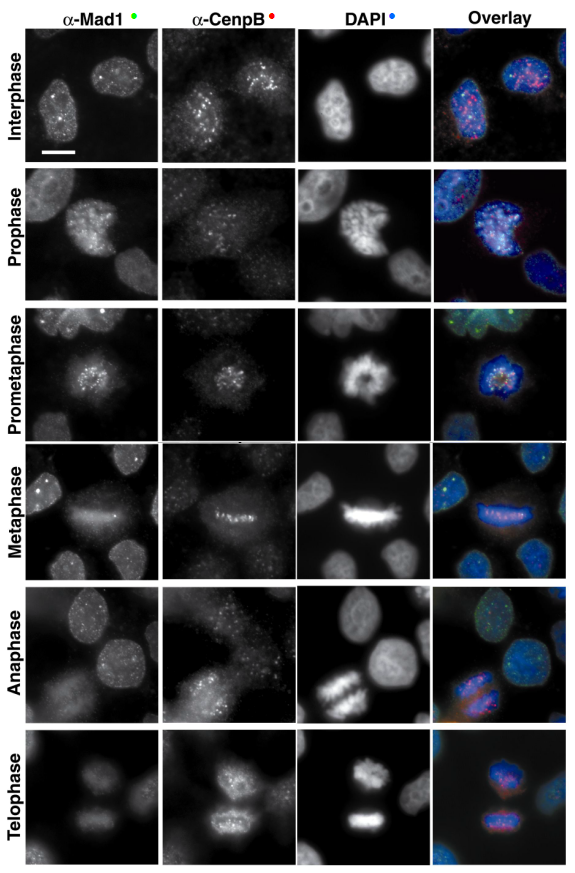
Fluorescence microscopy micrographs, showing the endogenous human protein Mad1 (one of the spindle checkpoint components) in green, along the different phases in mitosis; CENP-B, in red, is a centromeric marker, and DAPI (in blue) stains DNA

The first protein to be assembled on the kinetochore is CENP-A (Cse4 in Saccharomyces cerevisiae). This protein is a specialized isoform of histone H3. CENP-A is required for incorporation of the inner kinetochore proteins CENP-C, CENP-H and CENP-I/MIS6. The relation of these proteins in the CENP-A-dependent pathway is not completely defined. For instance, CENP-C localization requires CENP-H in chicken cells, but it is independent of CENP-I/MIS6 in human cells. In C. elegans and metazoa, the incorporation of many proteins in the outer kinetochore depends ultimately on CENP-A.

Kinetochore proteins can be grouped according to their concentration at kinetochores during mitosis: some proteins remain bound throughout cell division, whereas some others change in concentration. Furthermore, they can be recycled in their binding site on kinetochores either slowly (they are rather stable) or rapidly (dynamic).

- Proteins whose levels remain stable from prophase until late anaphase include constitutive components of the inner plate and the stable components of the outer kinetocore, such as the Ndc80 complex, KNL/KBP proteins (kinetochore-null/KNL-binding protein), MIS proteins and CENP-F. Together with the constitutive components, these proteins seem to organize the nuclear core of the inner and outer structures in the kinetochore.
- The dynamic components that vary in concentration on kinetochores during mitosis include the molecular motors CENP-E and dynein (as well as their target components ZW10 and ROD), and the spindle checkpoint proteins (such as Mad1, Mad2, BubR1 and Cdc20). These proteins assemble on the kinetochore in high concentrations in the absence of microtubules; however, the higher the number of MTs anchored to the kinetochore, the lower the concentrations of these proteins. At metaphase, CENP-E, Bub3 and Bub1 levels diminish by a factor of about three to four as compared with free kinetochores, whereas dynein/dynactin, Mad1, Mad2 and BubR1 levels are reduced by a factor of more than 10 to 100.
- Whereas the spindle checkpoint protein levels present in the outer plate diminish as MTs anchor, other components such as EB1, APC and proteins in the Ran pathway (RanGap1 and RanBP2) associate to kinetochores only when MTs are anchored. This may belong to a mechanism in the kinetochore to recognize the microtubules' plus-end (+), ensuring their proper anchoring and regulating their dynamic behavior as they remain anchored.

A 2010 study used a complex method (termed "multiclassifier combinatorial proteomics" or MCCP) to analyze the proteomic composition of vertebrate chromosomes, including kinetochores. Although this study does not include a biochemical enrichment for kinetochores, obtained data include all the centromeric subcomplexes, with peptides from all 125 known centromeric proteins. According to this study, there are still about one hundred unknown kinetochore proteins, doubling the known structure during mitosis, which confirms the kinetochore as one of the most complex cellular substructures. Consistently, a comprehensive literature survey indicated that there had been at least 196 human proteins already experimentally shown to be localized at kinetochores.

== Function ==
The number of microtubules attached to one kinetochore is variable: in Saccharomyces cerevisiae only one MT binds each kinetochore, whereas in mammals there can be 15–35 MTs bound to each kinetochore. However, not all the MTs in the spindle attach to one kinetochore. There are MTs that extend from one centrosome to the other (and they are responsible for spindle length) and some shorter ones are interdigitated between the long MTs. Professor B. Nicklas (Duke University), showed that, if one breaks down the MT-kinetochore attachment using a laser beam, chromatids can no longer move, leading to an abnormal chromosome distribution. These experiments also showed that kinetochores have polarity, and that kinetochore attachment to MTs emanating from one or the other centrosome will depend on its orientation. This specificity guarantees that only one chromatid will move to each spindle side, thus ensuring the correct distribution of the genetic material. Thus, one of the basic functions of the kinetochore is the MT attachment to the spindle, which is essential to correctly segregate sister chromatids. If anchoring is incorrect, errors may ensue, generating aneuploidy, with catastrophic consequences for the cell. To prevent this from happening, there are mechanisms of error detection and correction (as the spindle assembly checkpoint), whose components reside also on the kinetochores. The movement of one chromatid towards the centrosome is produced primarily by MT depolymerization in the binding site with the kinetochore. These movements require also force generation, involving molecular motors likewise located on the kinetochores.

=== Chromosome anchoring to MTs in the mitotic spindle ===
==== Capturing MTs ====
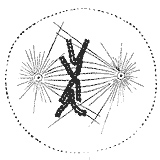
Chromosomes attach to the mitotic spindle through sister kinetochores, in a bipolar orientation

During the synthesis phase (S phase) in the cell cycle, the centrosome starts to duplicate. Just at the beginning of mitosis, both centrioles in each centrosome reach their maximal length, centrosomes recruit additional material and their nucleation capacity for microtubules increases. As mitosis progresses, both centrosomes separate to establish the mitotic spindle. In this way, the spindle in a mitotic cell has two poles emanating microtubules. Microtubules are long proteic filaments with asymmetric extremes, a "minus"(-) end relatively stable next to the centrosome, and a "plus"(+) end enduring alternate phases of growing-shrinking, exploring the center of the cell. During this searching process, a microtubule may encounter and capture a chromosome through the kinetochore. Microtubules that find and attach a kinetochore become stabilized, whereas those microtubules remaining free are rapidly depolymerized. As chromosomes have two kinetochores associated back-to-back (one on each sister chromatid), when one of them becomes attached to the microtubules generated by one of the cellular poles, the kinetochore on the sister chromatid becomes exposed to the opposed pole; for this reason, most of the times the second kinetochore becomes attached to the microtubules emanating from the opposing pole, in such a way that chromosomes are now bi-oriented, one fundamental configuration (also termed amphitelic) to ensure the correct segregation of both chromatids when the cell will divide.

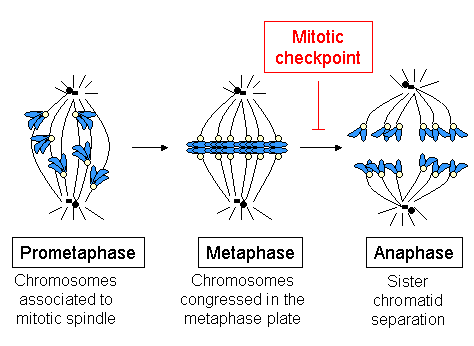
Scheme showing cell cycle progression between prometaphase and anaphase. (Chromosomes are in blue and kinetochores in light yellow).

When just one microtubule is anchored to one kinetochore, it starts a rapid movement of the associated chromosome towards the pole generating that microtubule. This movement is probably mediated by the motor activity towards the "minus" (-) of the motor protein cytoplasmic dynein, which is very concentrated in the kinetochores not anchored to MTs. The movement towards the pole is slowed down as far as kinetochores acquire kMTs (MTs anchored to kinetochores) and the movement becomes directed by changes in kMTs length. Dynein is released from kinetochores as they acquire kMTs and, in cultured mammalian cells, it is required for the spindle checkpoint inactivation, but not for chromosome congression in the spindle equator, kMTs acquisition or anaphase A during chromosome segregation. In higher plants or in yeast there is no evidence of dynein, but other kinesins towards the (-) end might compensate for the lack of dynein.

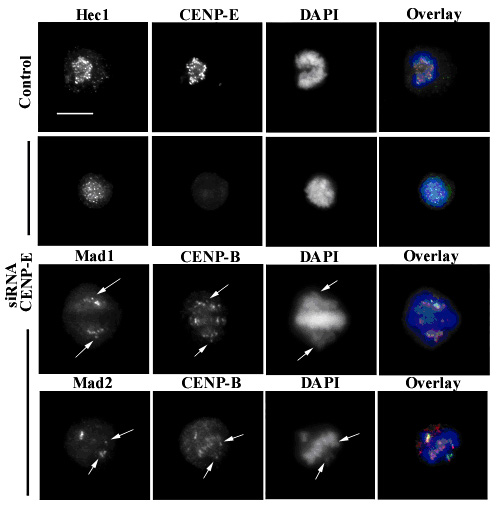
Metaphase cells with low CENP-E levels by RNAi, showing chromosomes unaligned at the metaphase plate (arrows). These chromosomes are labeled with antibodies against the mitotic checkpoint proteins Mad1/Mad2. Hec1 and CENP-B label the centromeric region (the kinetochore), and DAPI is a specific stain for DNA.

Another motor protein implicated in the initial capture of MTs is CENP-E; this is a high molecular weight kinesin associated with the fibrous corona at mammalian kinetochores from prometaphase until anaphase. In cells with low levels of CENP-E, chromosomes lack this protein at their kinetochores, which quite often are defective in their ability to congress at the metaphase plate. In this case, some chromosomes may remain chronically mono-oriented (anchored to only one pole), although most chromosomes may congress correctly at the metaphase plate.

It is widely accepted that the kMTs fiber (the bundle of microtubules bound to the kinetochore) is originated by the capture of MTs polymerized at the centrosomes and spindle poles in mammalian cultured cells. However, MTs directly polymerized at kinetochores might also contribute significantly. The manner in which the centromeric region or kinetochore initiates the formation of kMTs and the frequency at which this happens are important questions, because this mechanism may contribute not only to the initial formation of kMTs, but also to the way in which kinetochores correct defective anchoring of MTs and regulate movement along kMTs.

==== Role of Ndc80 complex ====
MTs associated to kinetochores present special features: compared to free MTs, kMTs are much more resistant to cold-induced depolymerization, high hydrostatic pressures or calcium exposure. Furthermore, kMTs are recycled much more slowly than astral MTs and spindle MTs with free (+) ends, and if kMTs are released from kinetochores using a laser beam, they rapidly depolymerize.

When it was clear that neither dynein nor CENP-E is essential for kMTs formation, other molecules should be responsible for kMTs stabilization. Pioneer genetic work in yeast revealed the relevance of the Ndc80 complex in kMTs anchoring. In Saccharomyces cerevisiae, the Ndc80 complex has four components: Ndc80p, Nuf2p, Spc24p and Spc25p. Mutants lacking any of the components of this complex show loss of the kinetochore-microtubule connection, although kinetochore structure is not completely lost. Yet mutants in which kinetochore structure is lost (for instance Ndc10 mutants in yeast) are deficient both in the connection to microtubules and in the ability to activate the spindle checkpoint, probably because kinetochores work as a platform in which the components of the response are assembled.

The Ndc80 complex is highly conserved and it has been identified in S. pombe, C. elegans, Xenopus, chicken and humans. Studies on Hec1 (highly expressed in cancer cells 1), the human homolog of Ndc80p, show that it is important for correct chromosome congression and mitotic progression, and that it interacts with components of the cohesin and condensin complexes.

Different laboratories have shown that the Ndc80 complex is essential for stabilization of the kinetochore-microtubule anchoring, required to support the centromeric tension implicated in the establishment of the correct chromosome congression in high eukaryotes. Cells with impaired function of Ndc80 (using RNAi, gene knockout, or antibody microinjection) have abnormally long spindles, lack of tension between sister kinetochores, chromosomes unable to congregate at the metaphase plate and few or any associated kMTs.

There is a variety of strong support for the ability of the Ndc80 complex to directly associate with microtubules and form the core conserved component of the kinetochore-microtubule interface. However, formation of robust kinetochore-microtubule interactions may also require the function of additional proteins. In yeast, this connection requires the presence of the complex Dam1-DASH-DDD. Some members of this complex bind directly to MTs, whereas some others bind to the Ndc80 complex. This means that the complex Dam1-DASH-DDD might be an essential adapter between kinetochores and microtubules. However, in animals an equivalent complex has not been identified, and this question remains under intense investigation.

=== Verification of kinetochore–MT anchoring ===
During S-Phase, the cell duplicates all the genetic information stored in the chromosomes, in the process termed DNA replication. At the end of this process, each chromosome includes two sister chromatids, which are two complete and identical DNA molecules. Both chromatids remain associated by cohesin complexes until anaphase, when chromosome segregation occurs. If chromosome segregation happens correctly, each daughter cell receives a complete set of chromatids, and for this to happen each sister chromatid has to anchor (through the corresponding kinetochore) to MTs generated in opposed poles of the mitotic spindle. This configuration is termed amphitelic or bi-orientation.

However, during the anchoring process some incorrect configurations may also appear:

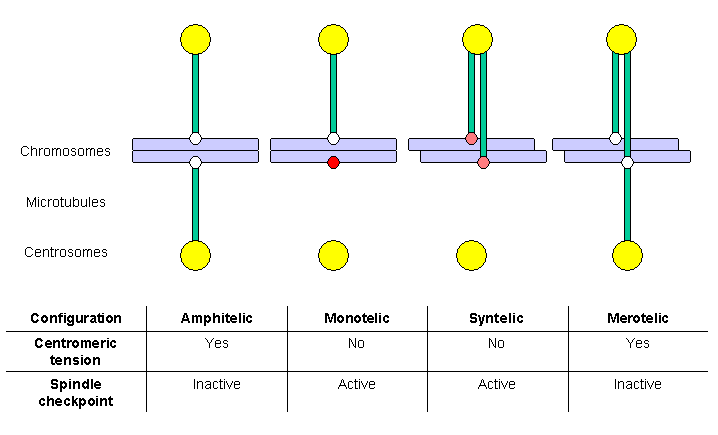
Scheme showing different anchoring configurations between chromosomes and the mitotic spindle.

- monotelic: only one of the chromatids is anchored to MTs, the second kinetochore is not anchored; in this situation, there is no centromeric tension, and the spindle checkpoint is activated, delaying entry in anaphase and allowing time for the cell to correct the error. If it is not corrected, the unanchored chromatid might randomly end in any of the two daughter cells, generating aneuploidy: one daughter cell would have chromosomes in excess and the other would lack some chromosomes.
- syntelic: both chromatids are anchored to MTs emanating from the same pole; this situation does not generate centromeric tension either, and the spindle checkpoint will be activated. If it is not corrected, both chromatids will end in the same daughter cell, generating aneuploidy.
- merotelic: at least one chromatid is anchored simultaneously to MTs emanating from both poles. This situation generates centromeric tension, and for this reason the spindle checkpoint is not activated. If it is not corrected, the chromatid bound to both poles will remain as a lagging chromosome at anaphase, and finally will be broken in two fragments, distributed between the daughter cells, generating aneuploidy.

Both the monotelic and the syntelic configurations fail to generate centromeric tension and are detected by the spindle checkpoint. In contrast, the merotelic configuration is not detected by this control mechanism. However, most of these errors are detected and corrected before the cell enters in anaphase. A key factor in the correction of these anchoring errors is the chromosomal passenger complex, which includes the kinase protein Aurora B, its target and activating subunit INCENP and two other subunits, Survivin and Borealin/Dasra B (reviewed by Adams and collaborators in 2001). Cells in which the function of this complex has been abolished by dominant negative mutants, RNAi, antibody microinjection or using selective drugs, accumulate errors in chromosome anchoring. Many studies have shown that Aurora B is required to destabilize incorrect anchoring kinetochore-MT, favoring the generation of amphitelic connections. Aurora B homolog in yeast (Ipl1p) phosphorilates some kinetochore proteins, such as the constitutive protein Ndc10p and members of the Ndc80 and Dam1-DASH-DDD complexes. Phosphorylation of Ndc80 complex components produces destabilization of kMTs anchoring. It has been proposed that Aurora B localization is important for its function: as it is located in the inner region of the kinetochore (in the centromeric heterochromatin), when the centromeric tension is established sister kinetochores separate, and Aurora B cannot reach its substrates, so that kMTs are stabilized. Aurora B is frequently overexpressed in several cancer types, and it is currently a target for the development of anticancer drugs.

=== Spindle checkpoint activation ===
The spindle checkpoint, or SAC (for spindle assembly checkpoint), also known as the mitotic checkpoint, is a cellular mechanism responsible for detection of:

- correct assembly of the mitotic spindle;
- attachment of all chromosomes to the mitotic spindle in a bipolar manner;
- congression of all chromosomes at the metaphase plate.

When just one chromosome (for any reason) remains lagging during congression, the spindle checkpoint machinery generates a delay in cell cycle progression: the cell is arrested, allowing time for repair mechanisms to solve the detected problem. After some time, if the problem has not been solved, the cell will be targeted for apoptosis (programmed cell death), a safety mechanism to avoid the generation of aneuploidy, a situation which generally has dramatic consequences for the organism.

Whereas structural centromeric proteins (such as CENP-B), remain stably localized throughout mitosis (including during telophase), the spindle checkpoint components are assembled on the kinetochore in high concentrations in the absence of microtubules, and their concentrations decrease as the number of microtubules attached to the kinetochore increases.

At metaphase, CENP-E, Bub3 and Bub1 levels decreases 3 to 4 fold as compared to the levels at unattached kinetochores, whereas the levels of dynein/dynactin, Mad1, Mad2 and BubR1 decrease >10-100 fold. Thus at metaphase, when all chromosomes are aligned at the metaphase plate, all checkpoint proteins are released from the kinetochore. The disappearance of the checkpoint proteins out of the kinetochores indicates the moment when the chromosome has reached the metaphase plate and is under bipolar tension. At this moment, the checkpoint proteins that bind to and inhibit Cdc20 (Mad1-Mad2 and BubR1), release Cdc20, which binds and activates APC/C^{Cdc20}, and this complex triggers sister chromatids separation and consequently anaphase entry.

Several studies indicate that the Ndc80 complex participates in the regulation of the stable association of Mad1-Mad2 and dynein with kinetochores. Yet the kinetochore associated proteins CENP-A, CENP-C, CENP-E, CENP-H and BubR1 are independent of Ndc80/Hec1. The prolonged arrest in prometaphase observed in cells with low levels of Ndc80/Hec1 depends on Mad2, although these cells show low levels of Mad1, Mad2 and dynein on kinetochores (<10-15% in relation to unattached kinetochores). However, if both Ndc80/Hec1 and Nuf2 levels are reduced, Mad1 and Mad2 completely disappear from the kinetochores and the spindle checkpoint is inactivated.

Shugoshin (Sgo1, MEI-S332 in Drosophila melanogaster) are centromeric proteins which are essential to maintain cohesin bound to centromeres until anaphase. The human homolog, hsSgo1, associates with centromeres during prophase and disappears when anaphase starts. When Shugoshin levels are reduced by RNAi in HeLa cells, cohesin cannot remain on the centromeres during mitosis, and consequently sister chromatids separate synchronically before anaphase initiates, which triggers a long mitotic arrest.

On the other hand, Dasso and collaborators have found that proteins involved in the Ran cycle can be detected on kinetochores during mitosis: RanGAP1 (a GTPase activating protein which stimulates the conversion of Ran-GTP in Ran-GDP) and the Ran binding protein called RanBP2/Nup358. During interphase, these proteins are located at the nuclear pores and participate in the nucleo-cytoplasmic transport. Kinetochore localization of these proteins seem to be functionally significant, because some treatments that increase the levels of Ran-GTP inhibit kinetochore release of Bub1, Bub3, Mad2 and CENP-E.

Orc2 (a protein that belongs to the origin recognition complex -ORC- implicated in DNA replication initiation during S phase) is also localized at kinetochores during mitosis in human cells; in agreement with this localization, some studies indicate that Orc2 in yeast is implicated in sister chromatids cohesion, and when it is eliminated from the cell, spindle checkpoint activation ensues. Some other ORC components (such orc5 in S. pombe) have been also found to participate in cohesion. However, ORC proteins seem to participate in a molecular pathway which is additive to cohesin pathway, and it is mostly unknown.

=== Force generation to propel chromosome movement ===
Most chromosome movements in relation to spindle poles are associated to lengthening and shortening of kMTs. One of the features of kinetochores is their capacity to modify the state of their associated kMTs (around 20) from a depolymerization state at their (+) end to polymerization state. This allows the kinetochores from cells at prometaphase to show "directional instability", changing between persistent phases of movement towards the pole (poleward) or inversed (anti-poleward), which are coupled with alternating states of kMTs depolymerization and polymerization, respectively. This kinetochore bi-stability seem to be part of a mechanism to align the chromosomes at the equator of the spindle without losing the mechanic connection between kinetochores and spindle poles. It is thought that kinetochore bi-stability is based upon the dynamic instability of the kMTs (+) end, and it is partially controlled by the tension present at the kinetochore. In mammalian cultured cells, a low tension at kinetochores promotes change towards kMTs depolymerization, and high tension promotes change towards kMTs polymerization.

Kinetochore proteins and proteins binding to MTs (+) end (collectively called +TIPs) regulate kinetochore movement through the kMTs (+) end dynamics regulation. However, the kinetochore-microtubule interface is highly dynamic, and some of these proteins seem to be bona fide components of both structures. Two groups of proteins seem to be particularly important: kinesins which work like depolymerases, such as KinI kinesins; and proteins bound to MT (+) ends, +TIPs, promoting polymerization, perhaps antagonizing the depolymerases effect.

- KinI kinesins are named "I" because they present an internal motor domain, which uses ATP to promote depolymerization of tubulin polymer, the microtubule. In vertebrates, the most important KinI kinesin controlling the dynamics of the (+) end assembly is MCAK. However, it seems that there are other kinesins implicated.
- There are two groups of +TIPs with kinetochore functions.
  - The first one includes the protein adenomatous polyposis coli (APC) and the associated protein EB1, which need MTs to localize on the kinetochores. Both proteins are required for correct chromosome segregation. EB1 binds only to MTs in polymerizing state, suggesting that it promotes kMTs stabilization during this phase.
  - The second group of +TIPs includes proteins which can localize on kinetochores even in absence of MTs. In this group there are two proteins that have been widely studied: CLIP-170 and their associated proteins CLASPs (CLIP-associated proteins). CLIP-170 role at kinetochores is unknown, but the expression of a dominant negative mutant produces a prometaphase delay, suggesting that it has an active role in chromosome alignment. CLASPs proteins are required for chromosome alignment and maintenance of a bipolar spindle in Drosophila, humans and yeast.
