= NDC80 =

Protein-coding gene in the species Homo sapiens

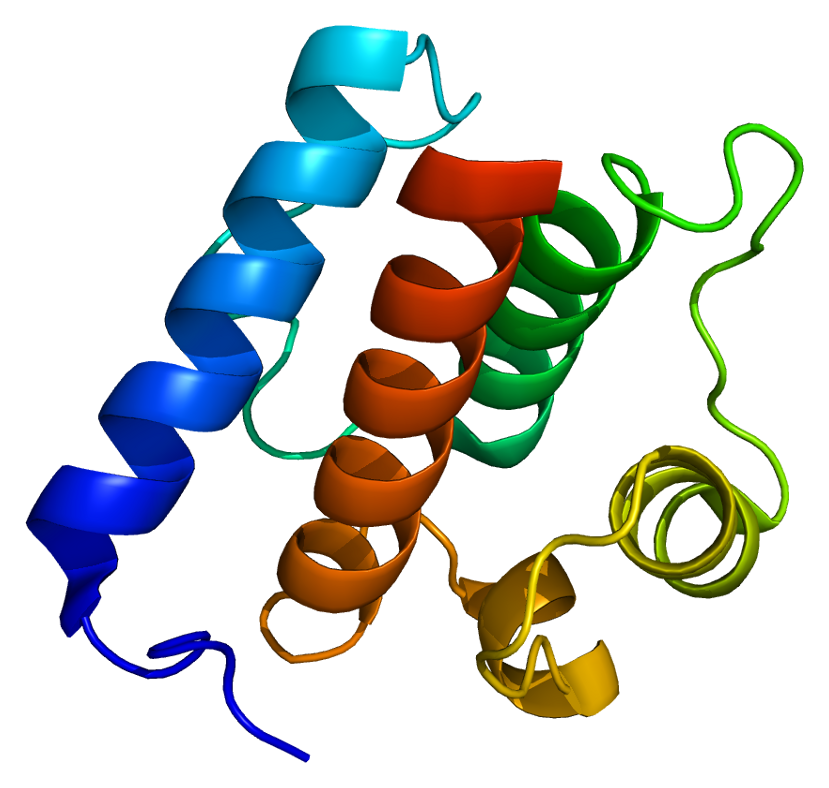
Available structures
PDB	Ortholog search: PDBe RCSB
PDB	List of PDB id codes 2IGP, 2VE7, 3IZ0

Identifiers
- Aliases: NDC80, HEC, HEC1, HsHec1, KNTC2, TID3, hskinetochore complex component, NDC80 kinetochore complex component
- External IDs: OMIM: 607272; MGI: 1914302; HomoloGene: 38141; GeneCards: NDC80; OMA:NDC80 - orthologs

Gene location (Human)
Chr.	Chromosome 18 (human)
Band	18p11.32	Start	2,571,557 bp
Band	18p11.32	End	2,616,635 bp

Gene location (Mouse)
Chr.	Chromosome 17 (mouse)
Band	17|17 E1.3	Start	71,803,095 bp
Band	17|17 E1.3	End	71,833,852 bp
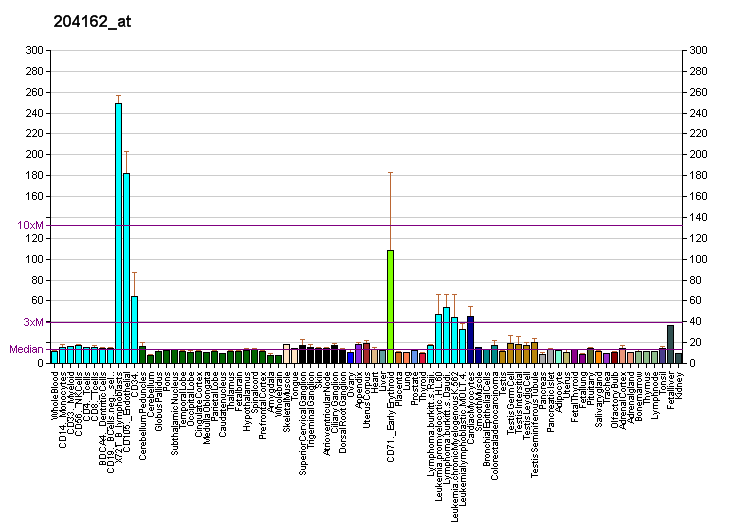
RNA expression pattern
Bgee	Human / Mouse (ortholog); Top expressed in: ventricular zone; ganglionic eminence; gonad; testicle; trabecular bone; amniotic fluid; bone marrow; secondary oocyte; sperm; seminal vesicula / Top expressed in: zygote; secondary oocyte; tail of embryo; genital tubercle; primary oocyte; spermatocyte; ventricular zone; epiblast; maxillary prominence; mandibular prominence; More reference expression data
BioGPS	More reference expression data
Gene ontology
Molecular function	structural constituent of cytoskeleton; protein binding; identical protein binding
Cellular component	cytosol; membrane; chromosome; Ndc80 complex; chromosome, centromeric region; nucleus; kinetochore; nucleoplasm; centrosome
Biological process	chromosome segregation; mitotic spindle organization; cell division; establishment of mitotic spindle orientation; mitotic sister chromatid segregation; cell cycle; attachment of spindle microtubules to kinetochore; sister chromatid cohesion; metaphase plate congression; attachment of mitotic spindle microtubules to kinetochore; positive regulation of mitotic cell cycle spindle assembly checkpoint; mitotic cell cycle; kinetochore organization; positive regulation of protein localization to kinetochore
Sources:Amigo / QuickGO
Orthologs
Species	Human	Mouse
Entrez	10403	67052
Ensembl	ENSG00000080986	ENSMUSG00000024056
UniProt	O14777	Q9D0F1
RefSeq (mRNA)	NM_006101	NM_023294
RefSeq (protein)	NP_006092	NP_075783
Location (UCSC)	Chr 18: 2.57 – 2.62 Mb	Chr 17: 71.8 – 71.83 Mb
PubMed search
- Wikidata
View/Edit Human	View/Edit Mouse

Kinetochore protein NDC80 homolog is a protein that in humans is encoded by the NDC80 gene.

== Function ==
Ndc80 is one of the proteins of outer kinetochore. It forms a heterotetramer with proteins NUF2, SPC25, and SPC24. This protein complex has microtubule-binding domains.

HEC is one of several proteins involved in spindle checkpoint signaling. This surveillance mechanism assures correct segregation of chromosomes during cell division by detecting unaligned chromosomes and causing prometaphase arrest until the proper bipolar attachment of chromosomes is achieved.

== Interactions ==
NDC80 has been shown to interact with MIS12, NEK2 and PSMC2.
