= Centromere protein A =

Protein found in humans

CENPA
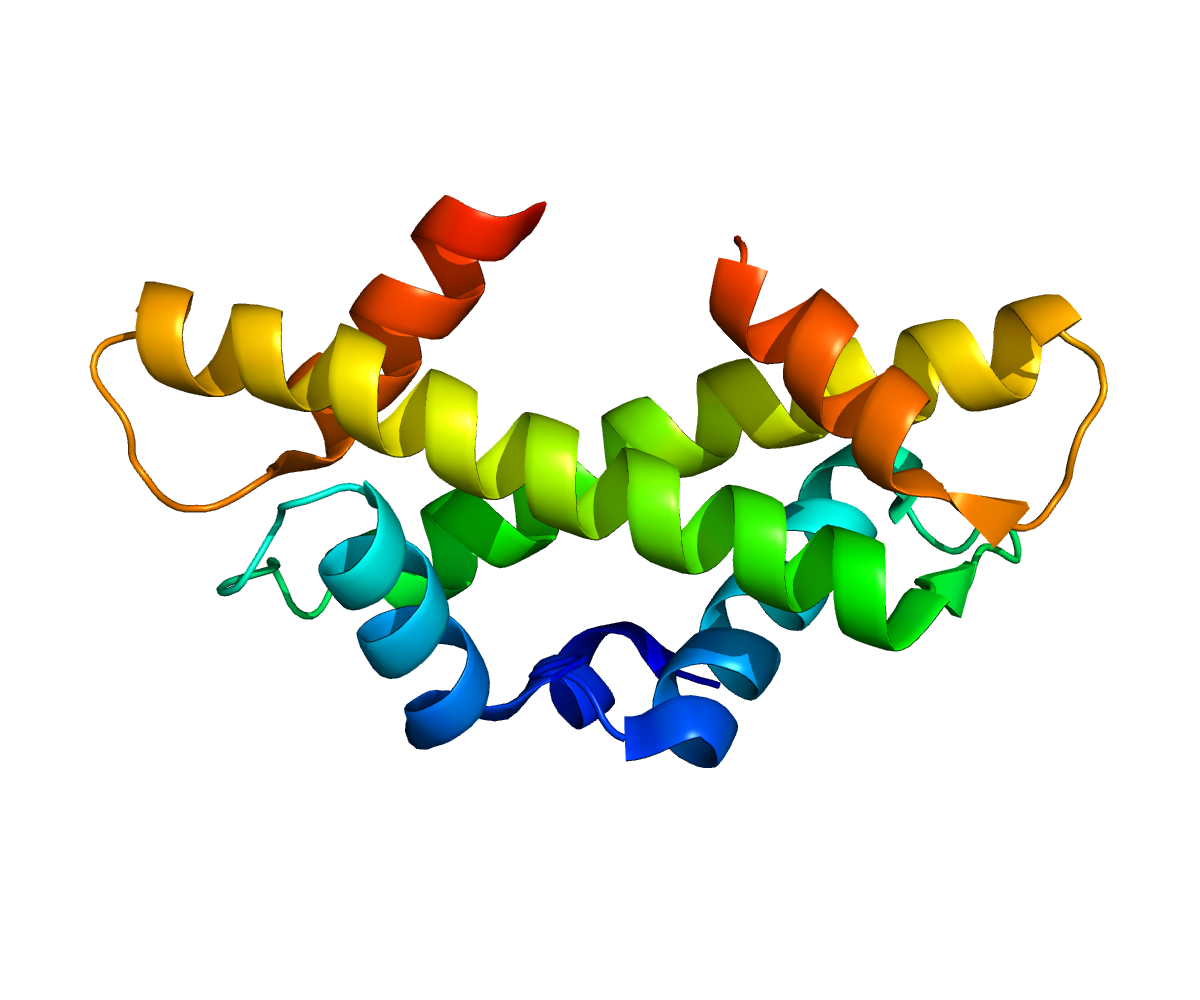

Identifiers
- Aliases: CENPA, CENP-A, CenH3, centromere protein A
- External IDs: OMIM: 117139; MGI: 88375; GeneCards: CENPA
Available structures
PDB	Ortholog search: PDBe RCSB
PDB	List of PDB id codes 3AN2, 3NQJ, 3NQU, 3R45, 3WTP, 5CVD

Gene location (Human)
Chr.	Chromosome 2 (human)
Band	2p23.3	Start	26,764,289 bp
Band	2p23.3	End	26,801,067 bp

Gene location (Mouse)
Chr.	Chromosome 5 (mouse)
Band	5 B1|5 16.76 cM	Start	30,824,121 bp
Band	5 B1|5 16.76 cM	End	30,832,174 bp
RNA expression pattern
Bgee	Human / Mouse (ortholog); Top expressed in: oocyte; secondary oocyte; gonad; ventricular zone; buccal mucosa cell; ganglionic eminence; testicle; thymus; trabecular bone; bone marrow / Top expressed in: endocardial cushion; ventricular zone; renal corpuscle; medial ganglionic eminence; maxillary prominence; mandibular prominence; abdominal wall; primitive streak; otic placode; tail of embryo; More reference expression data
BioGPS	n/a
Gene ontology
Molecular function	DNA binding; chromatin binding; protein binding; protein heterodimerization activity; nucleosomal DNA binding
Cellular component	inner kinetochore; cytosol; nucleoplasm; chromosome; chromosome, centromeric region; nucleus; kinetochore; nucleosome
Biological process	CENP-A containing chromatin assembly; establishment of mitotic spindle orientation; protein localization to chromosome, centromeric region; viral process; kinetochore assembly; sister chromatid cohesion; mitotic cytokinesis; cell cycle; cell division; nucleosome assembly
Sources:Amigo / QuickGO
Orthologs
Databases	NCBI: entry; OMA: entry
Species	Human	Mouse
Entrez	1058	12615
Ensembl	ENSG00000115163	ENSMUSG00000029177
UniProt	P49450	O35216
RefSeq (mRNA)	NM_001809; NM_001042426	NM_007681; NM_001302129; NM_001302130; NM_001302131; NM_001302132
RefSeq (protein)	NP_001035891; NP_001800	NP_001289058; NP_001289059; NP_001289060; NP_001289061; NP_031707
Location (UCSC)	Chr 2: 26.76 – 26.8 Mb	Chr 5: 30.82 – 30.83 Mb
PubMed search
- Wikidata
View/Edit Human	View/Edit Mouse

Centromere protein A, also known as CENPA, is a protein which in humans is encoded by the CENPA gene. CENPA is a histone H3 variant which is the critical factor determining the kinetochore position(s) on each chromosome in most eukaryotes including humans.

== Function ==
CENPA is a protein which epigenetically defines the position of the centromere on each chromosome, determining the position of kinetochore assembly and the final site of sister chromatid cohesion during mitosis. This proteins is frequently accompanied by "centrochromatin"-associated changes to canonical histones and is constitutively present in centromeres. The CENPA protein is a histone H3 variant which replaces one or both canonical H3 histones in a subset of nucleosomes within centromeric chromatin. CENPA has the greatest sequence divergence of the histone H3 variants, with just 48% similarity to canonical histone H3, and has a highly diverged N-terminal tail that lacks many well characterised histone modification sites including H3K4, H3K9 and H3K27.

Unusually for a histone, CENPA nucleosomes are not loaded together with DNA replication and are loaded at different cell cycle stages in different organisms: G1 phase in human, M phase in drosophila, G2 in S. pombe. To orchestrate this specialised loading there are CENPA-specific histone chaperones: HJURP in human, CAL1 in drosophila, nefr-1 in C. elegans and Scm3 in S. pombe. In most eukaryotes CENPA is loaded into large domains of highly repetitive satellite DNA. The position of CENPA within satellite DNA are heritable at the protein level through a purely epigenetic mechanism. This means that the position of CENPA protein binding to the genome is copied upon cell division to the two daughter cells independent of the underlying DNA sequence. Under circumstances in which CENPA is lost from a chromosome a fail-safe mechanism has been described in human cells in which CENPB recruits CENPA via a satellite DNA binding domain to repopulate the centromere with CENPA nucleosomes.

CENPA interacts directly with the inner kinetochore through proteins including CENPC and CENPN. Through this interaction the microtubules are able to accurately segregate chromosomes during mitosis.
