= Centromere protein I =

Protein found in humans

CENPI

Identifiers
- Aliases: CENPI, CENP-I, FSHPRH1, LRPR1, Mis6, centromere protein I
- External IDs: OMIM: 300065; MGI: 2147897; GeneCards: CENPI

Gene location (Human)
Chr.	X chromosome (human)
Band	Xq22.1	Start	101,098,188 bp
Band	Xq22.1	End	101,166,126 bp

Gene location (Mouse)
Chr.	X chromosome (mouse)
Band	X|X E3	Start	133,208,833 bp
Band	X|X E3	End	133,263,388 bp
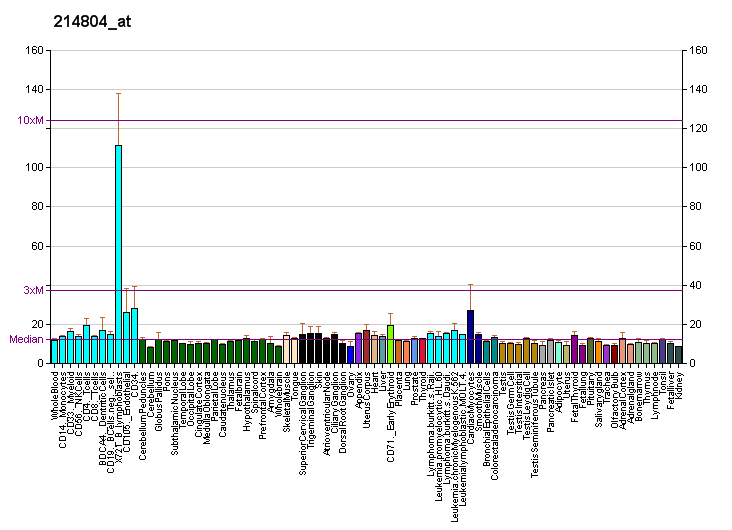

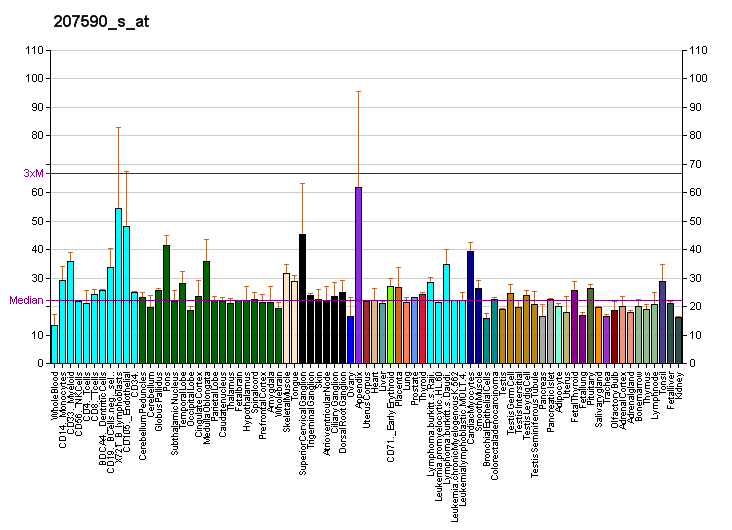
RNA expression pattern
Bgee	Human / Mouse (ortholog); Top expressed in: secondary oocyte; ventricular zone; gonad; ganglionic eminence; testicle; stromal cell of endometrium; smooth muscle tissue; bone marrow; rectum; trabecular bone / Top expressed in: hand; tail of embryo; dermis; genital tubercle; otic vesicle; abdominal wall; endothelial cell of lymphatic vessel; ventricular zone; renal corpuscle; spermatid; More reference expression data
BioGPS	More reference expression data
Gene ontology
Molecular function	protein binding
Cellular component	chromosome; chromosome, centromeric region; nucleoplasm; kinetochore; nucleus; cytosol; nuclear body
Biological process	sex differentiation; centromere complex assembly; CENP-A containing chromatin assembly
Sources:Amigo / QuickGO
Orthologs
Databases	NCBI: entry; OMA: entry
Species	Human	Mouse
Entrez	2491	102920
Ensembl	ENSG00000102384	ENSMUSG00000031262
UniProt	Q92674	Q8K1K4
RefSeq (mRNA)	NM_006733; NM_001318521; NM_001318523; NM_001386188	NM_145924; NM_001305631
RefSeq (protein)	NP_001305450; NP_001305452; NP_006724	NP_001292560; NP_666036
Location (UCSC)	Chr X: 101.1 – 101.17 Mb	Chr X: 133.21 – 133.26 Mb
PubMed search
- Wikidata
View/Edit Human	View/Edit Mouse

Centromere protein I is a protein that in humans is encoded by the CENPI gene.

== Function ==
The product of this gene is involved in the response of gonadal tissues to follicle-stimulating hormone. This gene is also a potential candidate for human X-linked disorders of gonadal development and gametogenesis. CENPI is a target gene of the transcription factor E2F. Additionally, CENPI expression is increased in breast cancer and this has been shown to cause chromosome instability in breast cancer cells.
