= Monocentric chromosome =

Chromosome that has only one centromere and forms a narrow constriction

Duplicated chromosome. (2) identifies the Monocentric centromere—the region that joins the two sister chromatids, or each half of the chromosome. In prophase of mitosis, specialized regions on centromeres called kinetochores attach chromosomes to spindle fibers.

The monocentric chromosome is a chromosome that has only one centromere in a chromosome and forms a narrow constriction.

Monocentric centromeres are the most common structure on highly repetitive DNA in plants and animals.

== Structure ==
Monocentric chromosomes as compared to holocentric chromosomes where the entire length of the chromosome acts as the centromere. In monocentric chromosomes there is one primary constriction and the centromere its CenH3 loci at this location.

Holocentric chromosomes are found throughout the plant and animal kingdoms such as the nematode Caenorhabditis elegans. Holocentric chromosomes do have an evolutionary advantage by preventing the loss of chromosome after a DNA double-strand break.

The centromere is the point of attachment for the mitotic apparatus

== Chromosomal aberrations ==
Deletions, duplications and translocations can produce a polycentric chromosome. This is troublesome for cells that divide often since at the time of anaphase the polycentric chromosome does not move to opposite poles of spindle fiber and the cell dies.

== See also ==
- Metacentric
- Submetacentric
- Acrocentric
- Telocentric
