= NEK2 =

Protein-coding gene in humans

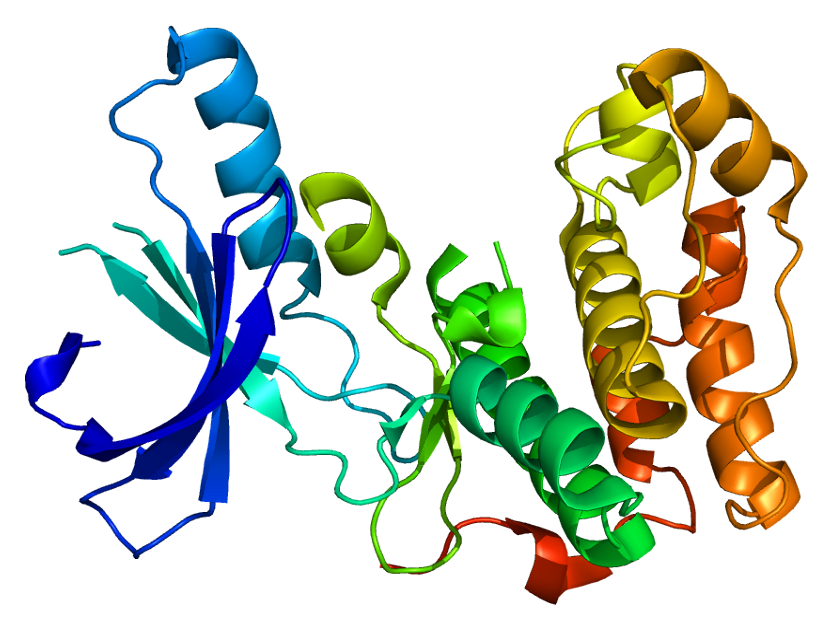

Identifiers
- Aliases: NEK2, HsPK21, NEK2A, NLK1, PPP1R111, RP67, NIMA related kinase 2
- External IDs: OMIM: 604043; MGI: 109359; GeneCards: NEK2
Available structures
PDB	Ortholog search: PDBe RCSB
PDB	List of PDB id codes 2JAV, 2W5A, 2W5B, 2WQO, 2XK3, 2XK4, 2XK6, 2XK7, 2XK8, 2XKC, 2XKD, 2XKE, 2XKF, 2XNM, 2XNN, 2XNO, 2XNP, 4A4X, 4AFE
Enzyme activity
EC #	BRENDA	ExPASy	KEGG	MetaCyc
2.7.11.1	↗	↗	↗	↗

Gene location (Human)
Chr.	Chromosome 1 (human)
Band	1q32.3	Start	211,658,657 bp
Band	1q32.3	End	211,675,630 bp

Gene location (Mouse)
Chr.	Chromosome 1 (mouse)
Band	1 H6|1 96.94 cM	Start	191,553,556 bp
Band	1 H6|1 96.94 cM	End	191,565,162 bp
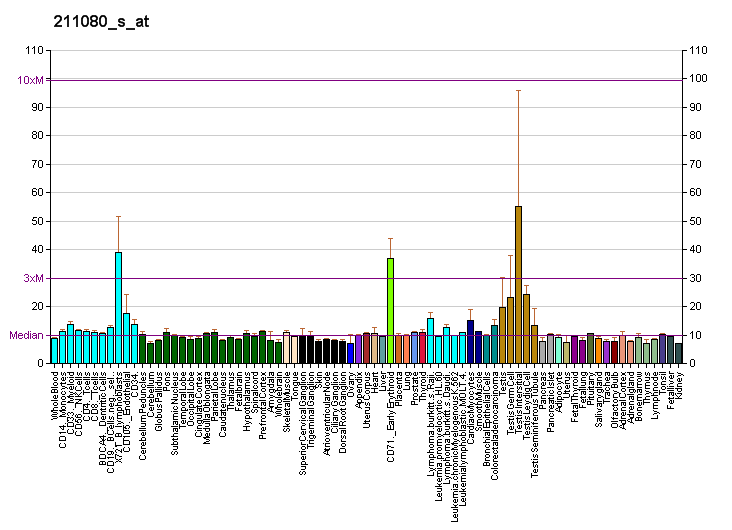

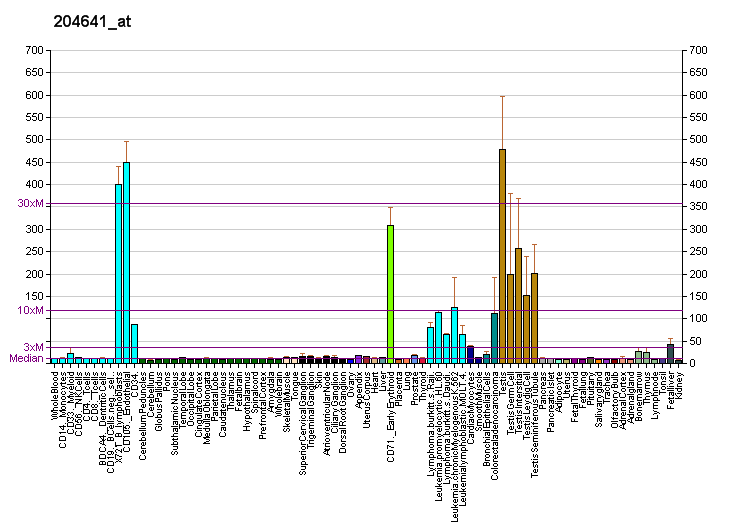
RNA expression pattern
Bgee	Human / Mouse (ortholog); Top expressed in: sperm; ventricular zone; secondary oocyte; left testis; right testis; gonad; ganglionic eminence; testicle; bone marrow; trabecular bone / Top expressed in: spermatocyte; primary oocyte; spermatid; zygote; testicle; secondary oocyte; yolk sac; epiblast; bone marrow; morula; More reference expression data
BioGPS	More reference expression data
Gene ontology
Molecular function	transferase activity; protein kinase activity; nucleotide binding; metal ion binding; kinase activity; protein serine/threonine kinase activity; protein binding; protein phosphatase binding; ATP binding
Cellular component	cytosol; centrosome; spindle pole; chromosome; condensed nuclear chromosome; microtubule organizing center; midbody; nucleolus; microtubule; chromosome, centromeric region; cytoskeleton; kinetochore; nucleoplasm; nucleus; cytoplasm; protein-containing complex
Biological process	positive regulation of telomere capping; regulation of mitotic centrosome separation; phosphorylation; chromosome segregation; negative regulation of DNA binding; positive regulation of telomere maintenance via telomerase; spindle assembly; cell division; protein phosphorylation; mitotic spindle assembly; G2/M transition of mitotic cell cycle; meiosis; positive regulation of telomerase activity; centrosome separation; mitotic sister chromatid segregation; protein autophosphorylation; cell cycle; negative regulation of centriole-centriole cohesion; regulation of attachment of spindle microtubules to kinetochore; blastocyst development; regulation of mitotic nuclear division; ciliary basal body-plasma membrane docking; mitotic cell cycle; regulation of G2/M transition of mitotic cell cycle
Sources:Amigo / QuickGO
Orthologs
Databases	NCBI: entry; OMA: entry
Species	Human	Mouse
Entrez	4751	18005
Ensembl	ENSG00000117650	ENSMUSG00000026622
UniProt	P51955	O35942
RefSeq (mRNA)	NM_001204182; NM_001204183; NM_002497	NM_010892
RefSeq (protein)	NP_001191111; NP_001191112; NP_002488	NP_035022
Location (UCSC)	Chr 1: 211.66 – 211.68 Mb	Chr 1: 191.55 – 191.57 Mb
PubMed search
- Wikidata
View/Edit Human	View/Edit Mouse

Serine/threonine-protein kinase Nek2 is an enzyme that in humans is encoded by the NEK2 gene.

== Interactions ==
NEK2 has been shown to interact with MAPK1 and NDC80. Protein kinase which is involved in the control of centrosome separation and bipolar spindle formation in mitotic cells and chromatin condensation in meiotic cells. Regulates centrosome separation (essential for the formation of bipolar spindles and high-fidelity chromosome separation) by phosphorylating centrosomal proteins such as CROCC, CEP250 and NINL, resulting in their displacement from the centrosomes. Regulates kinetochore microtubule attachment stability in mitosis via phosphorylation of NDC80. Involved in regulation of mitotic checkpoint protein complex via phosphorylation of CDC20 and MAD2L1. Plays an active role in chromatin condensation during the first meiotic division through phosphorylation of HMGA2. Phosphorylates: PPP1CC; SGOL1; NECAB3 and NPM1. Essential for localization of MAD2L1 to kinetochore and MAPK1 and NPM1 to the centrosome. Isoform 1 phosphorylates and activates NEK11 in G1/S-arrested cells. Isoform 2, which is not present in the nucleolus, does not [Uniprot].
