= SPC24 =

Protein-coding gene in the species Homo sapiens

Available structures
PDB	Ortholog search: PDBe RCSB
PDB	List of PDB id codes 2VE7, 3IZ0

Identifiers
- Aliases: SPC24, SPBC24, NDC80 kinetochore complex component, SPC24 component of NDC80 kinetochore complex
- External IDs: OMIM: 609394; MGI: 1914879; HomoloGene: 12166; GeneCards: SPC24; OMA:SPC24 - orthologs

Gene location (Human)
Chr.	Chromosome 19 (human)
Band	19p13.2	Start	11,131,520 bp
Band	19p13.2	End	11,155,808 bp

Gene location (Mouse)
Chr.	Chromosome 9 (mouse)
Band	9|9 A3	Start	21,666,738 bp
Band	9|9 A3	End	21,671,599 bp
RNA expression pattern
Bgee	Human / Mouse (ortholog); Top expressed in: ventricular zone; ganglionic eminence; stromal cell of endometrium; trabecular bone; testicle; bone marrow; gonad; mucosa of transverse colon; bone marrow cells; appendix / Top expressed in: hand; yolk sac; embryo; embryo; epiblast; ventricular zone; thymus; morula; primitive streak; Paneth cell; More reference expression data
BioGPS	n/a
Gene ontology
Molecular function	protein binding
Cellular component	cytosol; Ndc80 complex; nucleolus; chromosome, centromeric region; nucleus; kinetochore; chromosome
Biological process	cell division; cell cycle
Sources:Amigo / QuickGO
Orthologs
Species	Human	Mouse
Entrez	147841	67629
Ensembl	ENSG00000161888	ENSMUSG00000074476
UniProt	Q8NBT2	Q9D083
RefSeq (mRNA)	NM_182513; NM_001317031; NM_001317032; NM_001317033	NM_026282; NM_001357331
RefSeq (protein)	NP_001303960; NP_001303961; NP_001303962; NP_872319	NP_080558; NP_001344260
Location (UCSC)	Chr 19: 11.13 – 11.16 Mb	Chr 9: 21.67 – 21.67 Mb
PubMed search
- Wikidata
View/Edit Human	View/Edit Mouse

Kinetochore protein Spc24 is a protein that in humans is encoded by the SPC24 gene.
