= HJURP =

Protein-coding gene in humans

Identifiers
- Aliases: HJURP, FAKTS, URLC9, hFLEG1, Holliday junction recognition protein
- External IDs: OMIM: 612667; MGI: 2685821; GeneCards: HJURP
Available structures
PDB	Ortholog search: PDBe RCSB
PDB	List of PDB id codes 3R45

Gene location (Human)
Chr.	Chromosome 2 (human)
Band	2q37.1	Start	233,833,416 bp
Band	2q37.1	End	233,854,566 bp

Gene location (Mouse)
Chr.	Chromosome 1 (mouse)
Band	1|1 D	Start	88,190,193 bp
Band	1|1 D	End	88,205,355 bp
RNA expression pattern
Bgee	Human / Mouse (ortholog); Top expressed in: ventricular zone; oocyte; secondary oocyte; gonad; ganglionic eminence; testicle; bone marrow; stromal cell of endometrium; bone marrow cell; trabecular bone / Top expressed in: Ileal epithelium; granulocyte; tail of embryo; ventricular zone; zygote; tibiofemoral joint; maxillary prominence; genital tubercle; mandibular prominence; otic vesicle; More reference expression data
BioGPS	n/a
Gene ontology
Molecular function	protein binding; identical protein binding; histone binding; DNA binding
Cellular component	nucleoplasm; chromosome; nucleus; chromosome, centromeric region; nucleolus; mitochondrion; cytosol
Biological process	CENP-A containing chromatin assembly; cell cycle; chromosome segregation; regulation of DNA binding; regulation of protein-containing complex assembly
Sources:Amigo / QuickGO
Orthologs
Databases	NCBI: entry; OMA: entry
Species	Human	Mouse
Entrez	55355	381280
Ensembl	ENSG00000123485	ENSMUSG00000044783
UniProt	Q8NCD3	Q6PG16
RefSeq (mRNA)	NM_001282962; NM_001282963; NM_018410	NM_198652
RefSeq (protein)	NP_001269891; NP_001269892; NP_060880	NP_766093; NP_941054
Location (UCSC)	Chr 2: 233.83 – 233.85 Mb	Chr 1: 88.19 – 88.21 Mb
PubMed search
- Wikidata
View/Edit Human	View/Edit Mouse

Holliday junction recognition protein is a protein in humans that is encoded by the HJURP gene.
