= NUF2 =

Protein-coding gene in humans

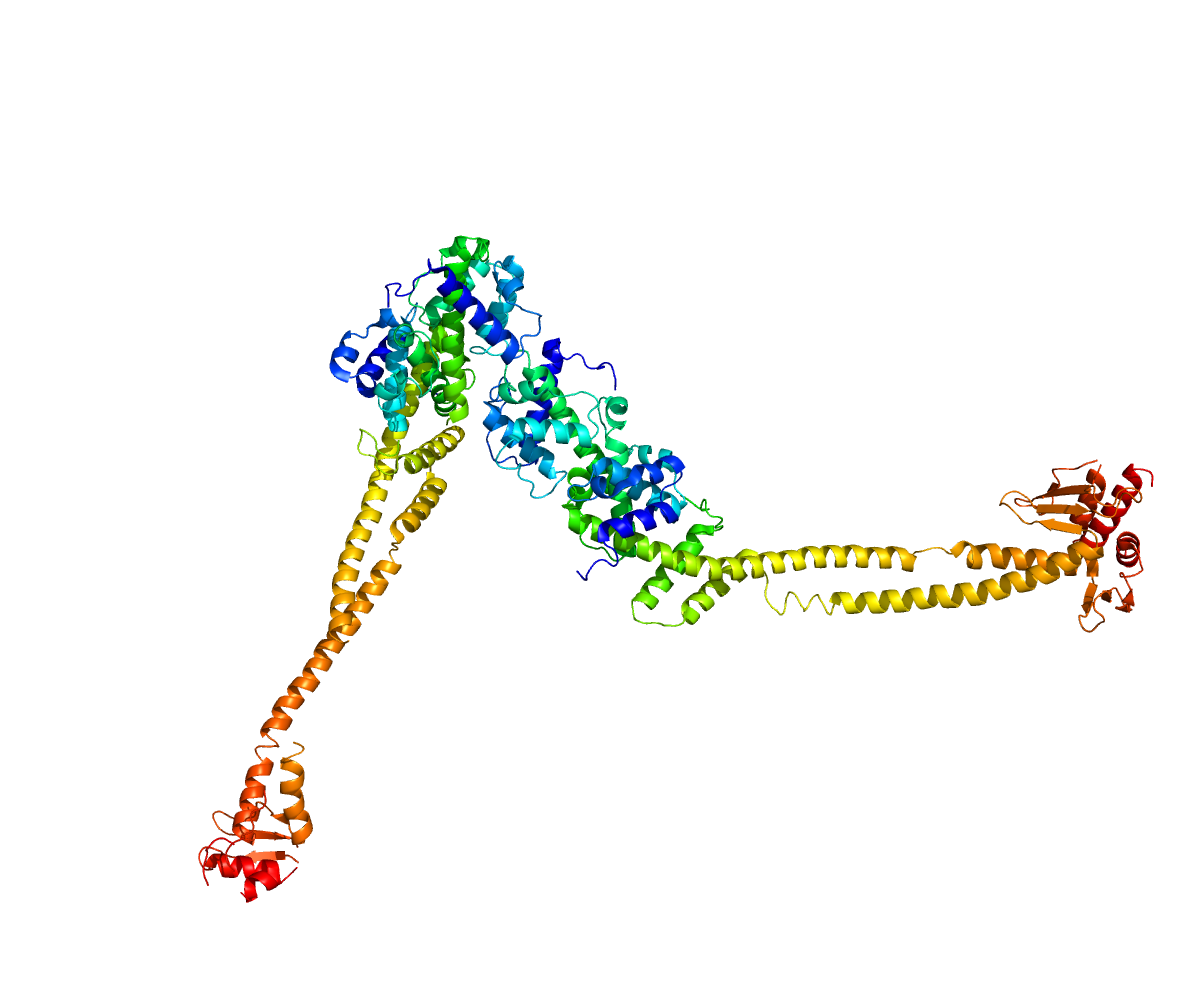

Identifiers
- Aliases: NUF2, CDCA1, CT106, NUF2R, NDC80 kinetochore complex component, NDC80 kinetochore complex component NUF2 component of NDC80 kinetochore complex
- External IDs: OMIM: 611772; MGI: 1914227; GeneCards: NUF2
Available structures
PDB	Ortholog search: PDBe RCSB
PDB	List of PDB id codes 2VE7, 3IZ0

Gene location (Human)
Chr.	Chromosome 1 (human)
Band	1q23.3	Start	163,266,576 bp
Band	1q23.3	End	163,355,764 bp

Gene location (Mouse)
Chr.	Chromosome 1 (mouse)
Band	1|1 H2.3	Start	169,325,503 bp
Band	1|1 H2.3	End	169,359,033 bp
RNA expression pattern
Bgee	Human / Mouse (ortholog); Top expressed in: ventricular zone; ganglionic eminence; thymus; gonad; right testis; left testis; testicle; sperm; bone marrow; trabecular bone / Top expressed in: spermatocyte; zygote; spermatid; tail of embryo; secondary oocyte; primary oocyte; ventricular zone; genital tubercle; dermis; maxillary prominence; More reference expression data
BioGPS	n/a
Gene ontology
Molecular function	protein binding; molecular function; protein-containing complex binding
Cellular component	cytosol; nucleus; membrane; chromosome, centromeric region; chromosome; kinetochore; Ndc80 complex
Biological process	cell division; cell cycle; chromosome segregation; sister chromatid cohesion; mitotic cell cycle; mitotic spindle organization; meiotic chromosome segregation; attachment of mitotic spindle microtubules to kinetochore; kinetochore organization
Sources:Amigo / QuickGO
Orthologs
Databases	NCBI: entry; OMA: entry
Species	Human	Mouse
Entrez	83540	66977
Ensembl	ENSG00000143228	ENSMUSG00000026683
UniProt	Q9BZD4	Q99P69
RefSeq (mRNA)	NM_031423; NM_145697	NM_023284; NM_001355159
RefSeq (protein)	NP_113611; NP_663735	NP_075773; NP_001342088
Location (UCSC)	Chr 1: 163.27 – 163.36 Mb	Chr 1: 169.33 – 169.36 Mb
PubMed search
- Wikidata
View/Edit Human	View/Edit Mouse

Kinetochore protein Nuf2 is a protein that in humans is encoded by the NUF2 gene.

This gene encodes a protein that is highly similar to yeast Nuf2, a component of a conserved protein complex associated with the centromere. Yeast Nuf2 disappears from the centromere during meiotic prophase when centromeres lose their connection to the spindle pole body, and plays a regulatory role in chromosome segregation.

The encoded protein is found to be associated with centromeres of mitotic HeLa cells, which suggests that this protein is a functional homolog of yeast Nuf2. Alternatively spliced transcript variants that encode the same protein have been described.
