= Centromere protein C =

Protein found in humans

CENPC

Identifiers
- Aliases: CENPC, CENP-C, CENPC1, MIF2, hcp-4, centromere protein C
- External IDs: OMIM: 117141; MGI: 99700; GeneCards: CENPC

Gene location (Human)
Chr.	Chromosome 4 (human)
Band	4q13.2	Start	67,468,762 bp
Band	4q13.2	End	67,545,503 bp

Gene location (Mouse)
Chr.	Chromosome 5 (mouse)
Band	5|5 E1	Start	86,159,883 bp
Band	5|5 E1	End	86,213,442 bp
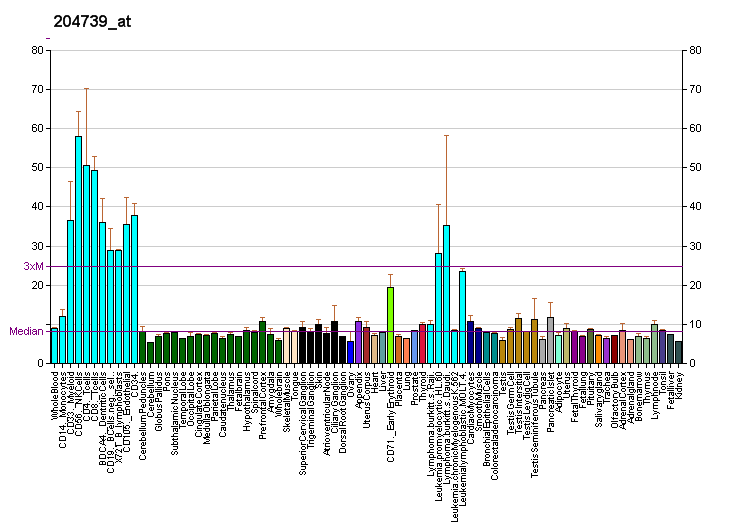
RNA expression pattern
Bgee	Human / Mouse (ortholog); Top expressed in: Achilles tendon; sural nerve; corpus callosum; bone marrow cell; testicle; tonsil; body of pancreas; gonad; ventricular zone; lymph node / Top expressed in: spermatocyte; tail of embryo; genital tubercle; ventricular zone; Gonadal ridge; otic placode; superior cervical ganglion; abdominal wall; otic vesicle; saccule; More reference expression data
BioGPS	More reference expression data
Gene ontology
Molecular function	DNA binding; centromeric DNA binding; protein binding; identical protein binding
Cellular component	pericentric heterochromatin; chromosome; chromosome, centromeric region; kinetochore; nucleus; nucleoplasm; cytosol; nuclear body; midbody; cleavage furrow; intercellular bridge; Flemming body
Biological process	chromosome segregation; cell division; kinetochore assembly; cell cycle; CENP-A containing chromatin assembly; attachment of mitotic spindle microtubules to kinetochore; monopolar spindle attachment to meiosis I kinetochore; mitotic cell cycle
Sources:Amigo / QuickGO
Orthologs
Databases	NCBI: entry; OMA: entry
Species	Human	Mouse
Entrez	1060	12617
Ensembl	ENSG00000145241	ENSMUSG00000029253
UniProt	Q03188	P49452
RefSeq (mRNA)	NM_001812; NM_001362481	NM_007683; NM_001345902; NM_001345903; NM_001345904
RefSeq (protein)	NP_001803; NP_001349410	NP_001332831; NP_001332832; NP_001332833; NP_031709
Location (UCSC)	Chr 4: 67.47 – 67.55 Mb	Chr 5: 86.16 – 86.21 Mb
PubMed search
- Wikidata
View/Edit Human	View/Edit Mouse

Centromere protein C is a protein that in humans is encoded by the CENPC gene (previously CENPC1).

Centromere protein C is a centromere autoantigen and a component of the inner kinetochore plate. The protein is required for maintaining proper kinetochore size and a timely transition to anaphase. A putative pseudogene exists on chromosome 12.
