= Centromere protein B =

Protein-coding gene in the species Homo sapiens

CENPB
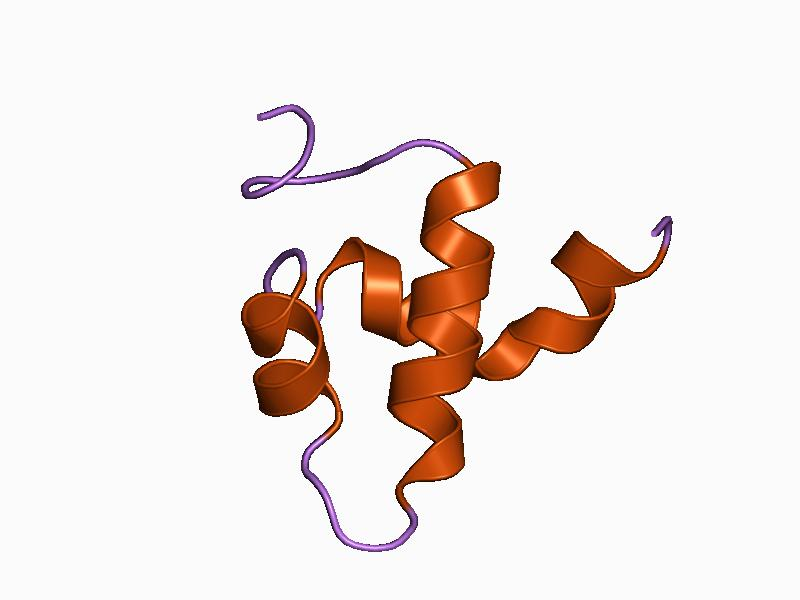

Identifiers
- Aliases: CENPB, entrez:1059, centromere protein B
- External IDs: OMIM: 117140; MGI: 88376; GeneCards: CENPB
Available structures
PDB	Ortholog search: PDBe RCSB
PDB	List of PDB id codes 1UFI, 1BW6, 1HLV

Gene location (Human)
Chr.	Chromosome 20 (human)
Band	20p13	Start	3,783,851 bp
Band	20p13	End	3,786,740 bp

Gene location (Mouse)
Chr.	Chromosome 2 (mouse)
Band	2 F1|2 63.29 cM	Start	131,017,102 bp
Band	2 F1|2 63.29 cM	End	131,021,987 bp
RNA expression pattern
Bgee	Human / Mouse (ortholog); Top expressed in: C1 segment; amygdala; apex of heart; gastrocnemius muscle; putamen; muscle of thigh; stromal cell of endometrium; nipple; inferior ganglion of vagus nerve; nucleus accumbens / Top expressed in: muscle of thigh; lip; parotid gland; dentate gyrus of hippocampal formation granule cell; lumbar subsegment of spinal cord; superior frontal gyrus; skin of external ear; lacrimal gland; extensor digitorum longus muscle; ventricular zone; More reference expression data
BioGPS	n/a
Orthologs
Databases	NCBI: entry; OMA: entry
Species	Human	Mouse
Entrez	1059	12616
Ensembl	ENSG00000125817	ENSMUSG00000068267
UniProt	P07199	P27790
RefSeq (mRNA)	NM_001810	NM_007682
RefSeq (protein)	NP_001801	NP_031708
Location (UCSC)	Chr 20: 3.78 – 3.79 Mb	Chr 2: 131.02 – 131.02 Mb
PubMed search
- Wikidata
View/Edit Human	View/Edit Mouse

Centromere protein B also known as major centromere autoantigen B is an autoantigen protein of the cell nucleus. In humans, centromere protein B is encoded by the CENPB gene.

== Function ==
Centromere protein B is a highly conserved protein that facilitates centromere formation. It is a DNA-binding protein that is derived from transposases of the pogo DNA transposon family. It contains a helix-loop-helix DNA binding motif at the N-terminus and a dimerization domain at the C-terminus. The DNA binding domain recognizes and binds a 17-bp sequence (CENP-B box) in the centromeric alpha satellite DNA. This protein is proposed to play an important role in the assembly of specific centromere structures in interphase nuclei and on mitotic chromosomes. It is also considered a major centromere autoantigen recognized by sera from patients with anti-centromere antibodies.

== Clinical significance ==
Centromere protein B is a potential biomarker of small-cell lung cancer.

== See also ==
- Centromere
