= Atlas of Genetics and Cytogenetics in Oncology and Haematology =

Content
- Description: The Atlas is a peer reviewed on-line journal / encyclopedia / database in open access dealing with chromosomes, genes and cancers and the biology of normal and cancerous cells.
- Data types captured: Annotation on chromosomes, genes and cancers
- Organisms: Human

Miscellaneous
- Versioning: Yes
- Data release frequency: every week
- Curation policy: Yes – manual (over 10,000 pages) and automatic (30,000 pages). Full review articles vs automatic annotation.

The Atlas of Genetics and Cytogenetics in Oncology and Haematology, created in 1997 by Jean-Loup Huret (with bioinformatics by Philippe Dessen) is a collection of resources on genes, chromosomes anomalies, leukemias, solid tumours, and cancer-prone diseases. The project is accessible through Internet and is made of encyclopedic-style files, as well as traditional overviews, links towards websites and databases devoted to cancer and/or genetics, case reports in haematology. It also encompasses teaching items in various languages.

Starting first from cytogenetics in the nineteens, the Atlas now combines different types of knowledge in a single web site: genes and their function, cell biology (ex: Apoptosis), pathological data, diseases and their clinical implications, cytogenetics, but also medical genetics, with hereditary disorders associated with an increased risk of cancer. This gives a wider and more global view of cancer genetics, while these data are usually dispersed. It includes a large iconography of about 35,000 images. Dan van Dyke said "This is one stop shopping that unifies cancer genetics information", and Lidia Larizza said that the Atlas was an "interdisciplinary resource". Felix Mitelman said "This systematic collection of cytogenetic and genetic aberrations (…) the molecular outcome (…) and the clinical consequences (….) has grown into a truly monumental encyclopedic work of great importance"; Janet Rowley said: "In the future I will undoubtedly rely on your Website rather than trying to keep up with the literature myself"

The Atlas is part of the genome project and participates in research on cancer epidemiology. The Atlas is accessed by 1- researchers in cytogenetics, molecular biology, cell biology; 2- clinicians, haematologists, cytogeneticists, and pathologists. Junior doctors in haematology or oncology, are also most receptive to the Atlas that they see as a training and educational tool; 3-Students in medicine and life sciences.

In 2017, it contains review articles on 1,500 genes, 700 papers on leukemias, 220 on solid tumors, and 110 on hereditary disease with a cancer-prone condition and 110 "Deep Insights" on related subjects, 40,000 internal links and 730,000 external links. This represents 45,000 "web pages" (i.e. about 200,000 printed pages). More than 3,300 authors have/are contributing (1 130 North-American, 400 French, 300 Italian, 200 Japanese, 180 Spanish, 170 German, 160 English, 140 Chinese, etc...) . It includes an iconography of about 35,000 images.

In 2018, Jesús María Hernández Rivas (Salamanca, Spain) and Paola Dal Cin (Boston, Massachusetts) joined Jean-Loup Huret as Co-Editors in Chief, and in April 2021 Alessandro Beghini (Milano, Italy) and João Agostinho Machado-Neto (São Paulo, Brazil) replace Jean-Loup Huret. "After 25 years building the Atlas day after day, Jean-Loup Huret and Philippe Dessen will take a little rest", as is said on the web site.

The Atlas is also published as a scientific journal by CNRS, and is referenced by Scopus et Embase. The Atlas is financially supported by scientific societies, charities and individual donations. More data is available from the site of the association in charge of the Atlas.

== See also ==
- COSMIC cancer database
- Ensembl genome database project
- Entrez Gene
- GenBank
- Gene Wiki
- HUGO Gene Nomenclature Committee
- International Agency for Research on Cancer
- International Classification of Diseases for Oncology
- Mitelman Database of Chromosome Aberrations and Gene Fusions in Cancer
- Online Mendelian Inheritance in Man
- UCSC Genome Browser
- HONcode

== Sources ==
- Brooksbank, Cath (December 2001). "Chopping and changing". Nature Reviews Cancer. 1 (3): 179. doi:10.1038/35106056. S2CID 29705598.
