= DECIPHER =

Biological database

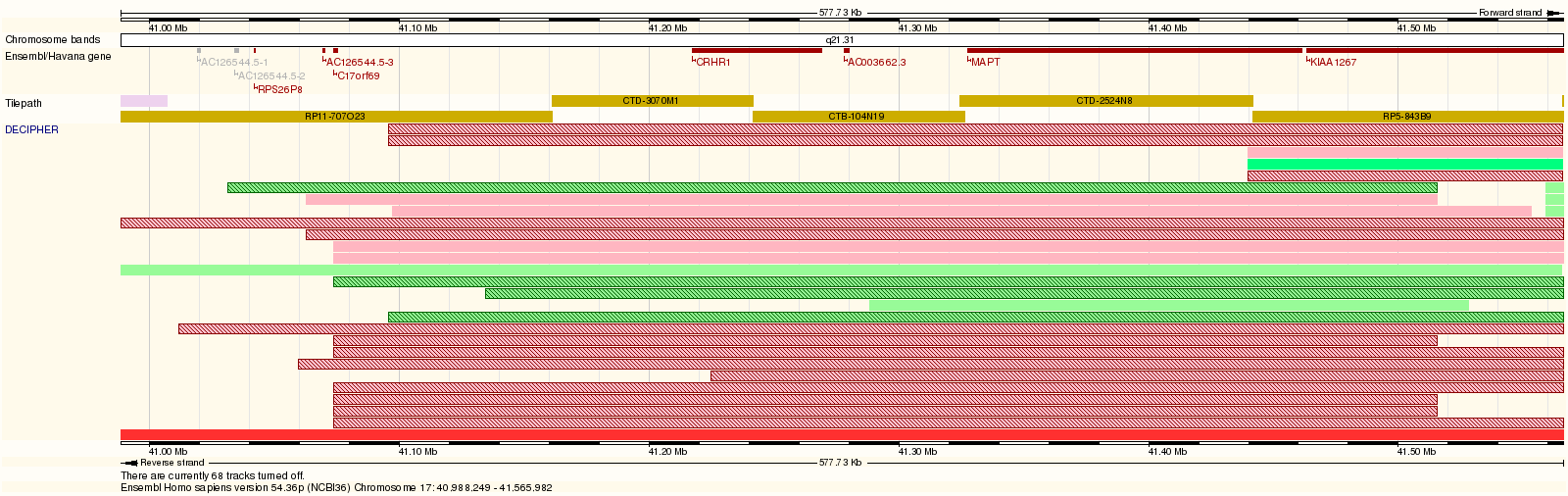
A segment of the human reference genome, viewed using Ensembl with the DECIPHER track enabled. Red bars represent individual mutations for anonymous patients with deletions across this region, while green bars represent patients with duplications across this region. The region shown encompasses the segment of chromosome missing in patients with 17q21.3 recurrent microdeletion syndrome.

DECIPHER is a web-based resource and database of genomic variation data from analysis of patient DNA. It documents submicroscopic chromosome abnormalities (microdeletions and duplications) and pathogenic sequence variants (single nucleotide variants - SNVs, Insertions, Deletions, InDels), from over 25000 patients and maps them to the human genome using Ensembl or UCSC Genome Browser. In addition it catalogues the clinical characteristics from each patient and maintains a database of microdeletion/duplication syndromes, together with links to relevant scientific reports and support groups.

An acronym of DatabasE of Chromosomal Imbalance and Phenotype in Humans using Ensembl Resources, DECIPHER was initiated in 2004 at the Sanger Institute in the United Kingdom, funded by the Wellcome Trust. However it is supported by an international research consortium, with patient data contributed by more than 240 clinical genetics centres from 33 countries. Each centre is represented by an experienced clinical geneticist and a senior molecular cytogeneticist.

== Aims ==
A schematic representation of a chromosome deletion. DECIPHER maps small deletions detected in patients to the reference genome produced by the Human Genome Project.

DECIPHER was established in 2004 by Nigel Carter of the Wellcome Trust Sanger Institute and Helen Firth, a clinical genetics consultant at Addenbrooke's Hospital in Cambridge. It has three main aims:

- Aid in the interpretation of plausibly pathogenic variants from genome- wide analyses by placing them in the context of known pathogenic variants, other plausibly pathogenic variants and population variation
- Annotate plausibly pathogenic variants with their likely functional impact using Ensembl tools to compare sequence and structural variants with the latest functional annotation of the current human reference genome e.g. define which genes are involved in a specific copy number variant (microdeletion / microduplication) or for sequence variants, whether they are positioned within a gene or regulatory element.
- Facilitate research into the study of genes that affect human health and development to improve diagnosis, management and therapy of rare diseases.

As a tool for clinical geneticists, cytogeneticists and molecular biologists, DECIPHER is used to determine whether gene copy number variations identified in patients are of clinical significance. Members can visualise the genes within the region of DNA altered in their patients, and ascertain whether any are known to be implicated in disease. Chromosomal imbalances are a major cause of developmental delay, learning disabilities and congenital abnormalities and — according to Emily Niemitz writing in Nature Genetics — the database facilitates collaboration between researchers and clinicians who have patients with similar clinical characteristics, which can "assist in the discovery of new syndromes and in the recognition of genes of clinical importance."

== Process ==
Patients are entered into DECIPHER by registered consortium members. Typically a clinical geneticist arranges for a chromosome analysis (usually microarray based) of a patient's DNA. A potential microdeletion/microduplication may be identified, but the medical significance is not known. The clinician may enter the anonymised data into the restricted, password protected DECIPHER database and map the location and size of the chromosomal deletion/duplication to the reference genome. Using DECIPHER, the clinician can then identify the specific genes affected by the deletion/duplication, determine whether any have known clinical significance (for example, whether tumour suppressor genes have been deleted), and view the region in the Ensembl genome browser to see whether there are any other consented patients in DECIPHER with overlapping deletion/duplications. This enables a better ascertainment of whether a copy number change is a normal polymorphic variant, or the likely cause of the patient's clinical symptoms. The clinician can then counsel the patient on the likely significance of the deletion/duplication, and its implications for their health.

Each patient's data is anonymized, and represented only by an ID with an associated genotype and set of clinical symptoms (phenotypes). Patient data is made accessible to other members of the consortium and viewable through Ensembl if a consent form is signed by the patient. With informed consent, the anonymized deletion/duplication and phenotypes become available for view to DECIPHER consortium members and public users, with different levels of access (e.g. only logged users can see the contact details of the centre that entered the data). Public users who wish to find more information about a patient may send a request to DECIPHER, which then will forward it to the clinician coordinator responsible for the submitting center.

Most patients deposited in DECIPHER display genetic mutations with a very low occurrence in the general population. Hence the probability of the same clinicians encountering similar patients are also low. Since DECIPHER is opened to any accredited clinician or cytogeneticist from around the world, the chances of finding similar rare cases are significantly increased. This on-line sharing of clinical genetic information not only promotes better understanding of microdeletions/microduplications and their associated pathogenic phenotypes, it has also facilitated the discovery of new syndromes. As of January 2014, over 23000 patients have been entered into the DECIPHER database of which over 10000 are consented.

== Ethics and privacy ==
The appropriate consent to enter patient data into DECIPHER is obtained by the submitting clinician. Patient consent can be withdrawn at any time, and their data is removed. Often children's records are displayed with the consent of their parents of guardians. DECIPHER advises that, when the child reaches the age of sixteen years, he or she be made aware of the entry and be given the opportunity to withdraw or continue as a participant. Each member centre that uses DECIPHER obtains ethical approval from a research ethics committee in their own institution or country, where applicable. In the UK, the Information Commissioner's Office has been notified about DECIPHER in accordance with the Data Protection Act 1998. The project is overseen by an advisory board representatives from the field of human genetics, computational biology, ethics and law.

To ensure information privacy, data is served over an encrypted TLS/SSL connection. Only trusted individuals from recognized medical research centres can access the identity of the center that submitted another patient (permitting them to contact the patient's clinicians should they wish to collaborate). Members of the public may browse consented anonymized patient data in DECIPHER and Ensembl, without the identity of the submitting centre being shown.

== See also ==
- Virtual Karyotype
- Mendelian Inheritance in Man
- MARRVEL, a website that uses DECIPHER as one of the six human genetic databases and seven model organism databases to integrate information.
