= Cot-1 =

Cot-1, COT-1, cot-1, or cot^{−1} may refer to:

- Cot-1 DNA, used in comparative genomic hybridization
- cot^{−1}y = cot^{−1}(y), sometimes interpreted as arccot(y) or arccotangent of y, the compositional inverse of the trigonometric function cotangent (see below for ambiguity)
- cot^{−1}x = cot^{−1}(x), sometimes interpreted as (cot(x))^{−1} = 1/cot(x) = tan(x) or tangent of x, the multiplicative inverse (or reciprocal) of the trigonometric function cotangent (see above for ambiguity)
- cot x^{−1}, sometimes interpreted as cot(x^{−1}) = cot(1/x), the cotangent of the multiplicative inverse (or reciprocal) of x (see below for ambiguity)
- cot x^{−1}, sometimes interpreted as (cot(x))^{−1} = 1/cot(x) = tan(x) or tangent of x, the multiplicative inverse (or reciprocal) of the trigonometric function cotangent (see above for ambiguity)

== See also ==
- Inverse function
- tan^{−1} (disambiguation)
