= Chromosome microdissection =

Chromosome microdissection is a technique that physically removes a large section of DNA from a complete chromosome. The smallest portion of DNA that can be isolated using this method comprises 10 million base pairs - hundreds or thousands of individual genes.

Scientists who study chromosomes are known as cytogeneticists. They are able to identify each chromosome based on its unique pattern of dark and light bands. Certain abnormalities, however, cause chromosomes to have unusual banding patterns. For example, one chromosome may have a piece of another chromosome inserted within it, creating extra bands. Or, a portion of a chromosome may be repeated over and over again, resulting in an unusually wide, dark band (known as a homogeneously staining region). Some chromosomal aberrations have been linked to cancer and inherited genetic disorders, and the chromosomes of many tumor cells exhibit irregular bands. To understand more about what causes these conditions, scientists hope to determine which genes and DNA sequences are located near these unusual bands. Chromosome microdissection is a specialized way of isolating these regions by removing the DNA from the band and making that DNA available for further study.

To prepare cells for chromosome microdissection, a scientist first treats them with a chemical that forces them into metaphase: a phase of the cell's life-cycle where the chromosomes are tightly coiled and highly visible. Next, the cells are dropped onto a microscope slide so that the nucleus, which holds all of the genetic material together, breaks apart and releases the chromosomes onto the slide. Then, under a microscope, the scientist locates the specific band of interest, and, using a very fine needle, tears that band away from the rest of the chromosome. The researcher next produces multiple copies of the isolated DNA using a procedure called PCR (polymerase chain reaction). The scientist uses these copies to study the DNA from the unusual region of the chromosome in question.
