= Jean-Loup Huret =

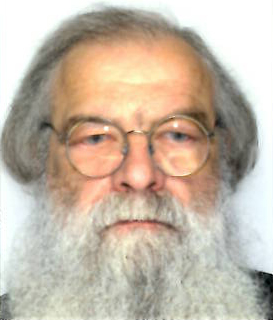
Jean-Loup Huret

Jean Loup Huret (born 1951) is a French scientist and medical practitioner specialist in genetics, honorary associate professor of medical genetics of the French Universities, working on chromosome abnormalities.

Huret has discovered the first case of Down syndrome with a normal karyotype. He proved, in collaboration with Pierre Marie Sinet's team, that it was due to a microduplication (less than 3 Mb) of DNA on chromosome 21, demonstrating that only a very few genes alteration could be responsible for most of the phenotype in a chromosome aberration syndrome. From this further arose the concept of critical region in chromosome syndromes (e.g Down syndrome critical region).

Huret is the creator in 1997 and editor in chief of the "Atlas of Genetics and Cytogenetics in Oncology and Haematology", an encyclopaedia, scientific journal, and database in free access on the Internet (45,000 pages, of which more than 10,000 pages have been written by more than 3,000 authors, 4,500 visitors a day), the director of the database is Philippe Dessen. This web site is devoted to Cancer Genetics, and provides review articles, cards and figures on genes and chromosomes alterations in all types of cancer.

He has conducted international studies on various types of acute leukemias, including t(11;19) (q23;p13), dic(9;12)(p13;p13), and t(1;22)(p13;q13) and also on down syndrome. He also participated in an international workshop on Down syndrome and has been part of the HUGO Gene Nomenclature Committee.

In 2011, Huret received the French distinction of "chevalier dans l’ordre national du Mérite" for his encyclopedic works. He is in the Who's Who in America – Marquis Who's Who, section Medicine and Healthcare since 2002, and in Who's Who in France since 2010. He received the "Albert Nelson Marquis Lifetime Achievement Award" in 2019.

Huret has also been interviewed by the press for his long-standing activity - more than thirty years – in painting workshops in institutions for mentally handicapped children and adults.. He has also run a painting workshop for inmates in a prison.
