= Felix Mitelman =

Swedish geneticist and professor

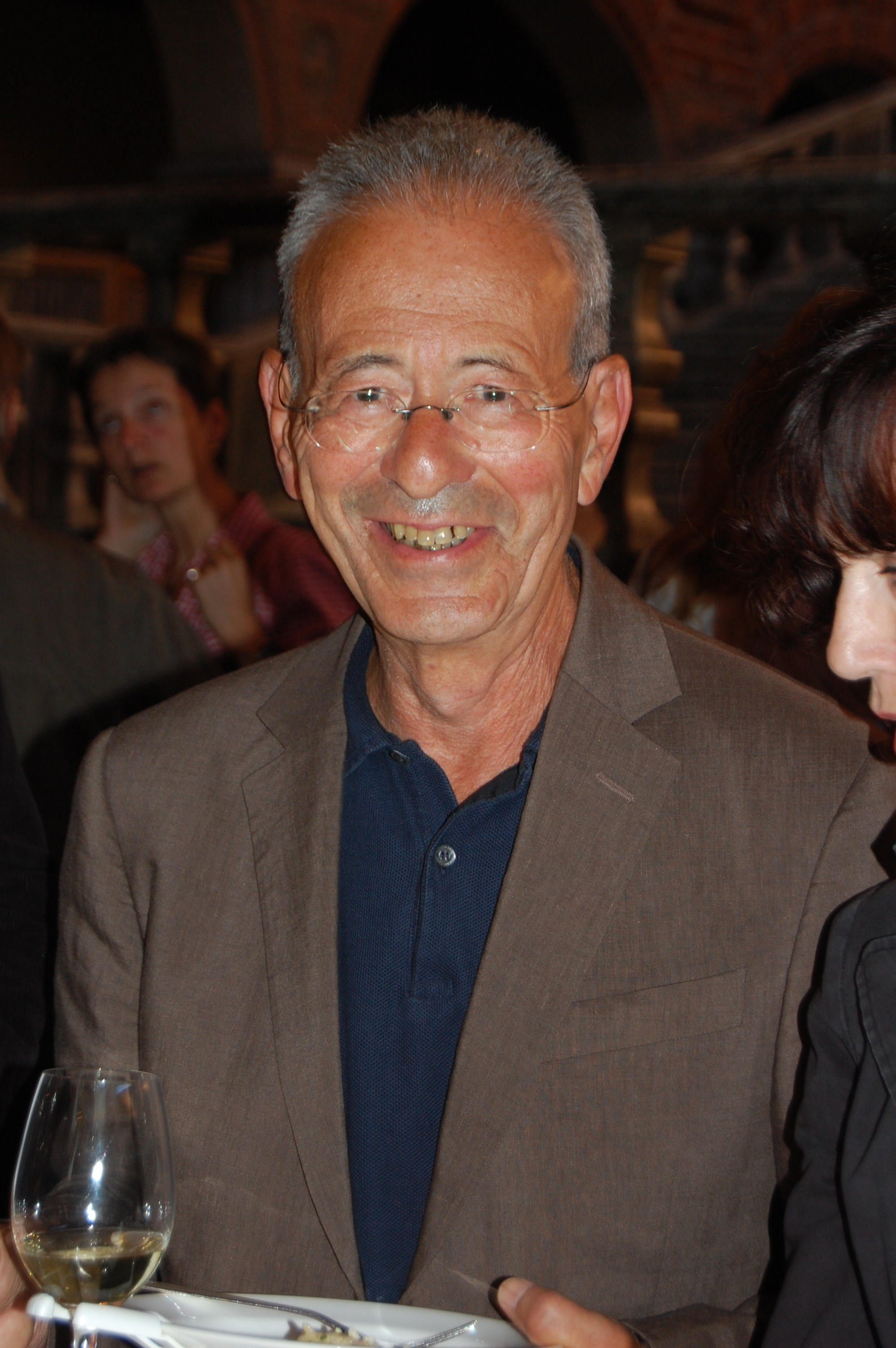
- Mitelman on 6 July 2009 at the European Cytogeneticists Association reception in the Stockholm City Hall
- Born: 26 August 1940 (age 84)
- Known for: work on chromosome changes in cancer

Felix Mitelman (born 26 August 1940) is a Swedish geneticist and is professor of clinical genetics in Lund, Sweden. He is best known for his pioneering work on chromosome changes in cancer.

He is a member of the Royal Swedish Academy of Sciences, the American Academy of Arts and Sciences, and the Polish Academy of Science. He was awarded the Jubilee Prize of the Swedish Medical Association in 1989, the Nordic Fernström prize in 2007, the Söderberg Prize in Medicine in 2008, and the European Society of Human Genetics Award in 2013. He is the founding editor (1989) and editor-in-chief of the scientific journal Genes, Chromosomes & Cancer.

== Key publications ==
In total, Mitelman has co-authored more than 700 academic papers. Together with Fredrik Mertens and Bertil Johansson he maintains a database of all published chromosome aberrations in neoplastic disorders, with clinical features, now numbering more than 79,000 cases (as of Jan 2025). The Mitelman Database of Chromosome Aberrations and Gene Fusions in Cancer also contains information on the molecular genetic and clinical consequences of cancer-associated chromosome aberrations. The database is available on-line. (See below.)

- Mitelman F: Catalog of Chromosome Aberrations in Cancer, Karger, Basel 1983, ISBN 3-8055-3813-8; 2nd Ed. Alan R. Liss, Inc., New York 1985, ISBN 0-8451-2405-6; 3rd Ed. Alan R. Liss, Inc., New York, 1988, ISBN 0-8451-4248-8; 4th Ed. Wiley-Liss, New York, 1991, ISBN 0-471-56087-1; 5th Ed. Wiley-Liss, New York, 1994, ISBN 0-471-11183-X; 6th Ed., CD-ROM, Wiley-Liss, New York, 1998.
- Mitelman, F: An International System for Human Cytogenetic Nomenclature. Karger, Basel, 1995, ISBN 3-8055-6226-8.
- Heim S & Mitelman F: Cancer Cytogenetics, 1st Ed., Alan R. Liss, Inc., New York, 1987, ISBN 0-8451-4239-9; 2nd Ed. Wiley-Liss, New York, 1995, ISBN 0-471-12052-9; 3rd Ed.Wiley-Blackwell, New York, 2009, ISBN 978-0-470-18179-9; 4th Ed. Wiley-Blackwell, New York, 2015, ISBN 978-1-118-79553-8.
- Mitelman, F; Mark, J; Levan, G; Levan, A (1972). "Tumor etiology and chromosome pattern". Science. 176 (1340): 1341. Bibcode:1972Sci...176.1340M. doi:10.1126/science.176.4041.1340. PMID 4338345. S2CID 2486102.
- Mitelman, F (1984). "Restricted number of chromosomal regions implicated in aetiology of human cancer and leukaemia". Nature. 310 (325): 327. Bibcode:1984Natur.310..325M. doi:10.1038/310325a0. PMID 6462218. S2CID 4323009.
- Mitelman, F; Mertens, F; Johansson, B (1997). "A breakpoint map of recurrent chromosomal rearrangements in human neoplasia". Nat Genet. 15: 417–474. doi:10.1038/ng0497supp-417. PMID 9140409. S2CID 22286489.
- Mitelman, F; Johansson, B; Mertens, F (2004). "Fusion genes and rearranged genes as a linear function of chromosome aberrations in cancer". Nat Genet. 36 (4): 331–334. doi:10.1038/ng1335. PMID 15054488.
- Mitelman, F; Johansson, B; Mertens, F (2007). "The impact of translocations and gene fusions on cancer causation". Nat Rev Cancer. 7 (4): 233–245. doi:10.1038/nrc2091. PMID 17361217. S2CID 26093482.
- Mertens, F; Johansson, B; Fioretos, T; Mitelman, F (2015). "The emerging complexity of gene fusions in cancer". Nature Reviews Cancer. 15 (6): 371–381. doi:10.1038/nrc3947. PMID 25998716. S2CID 484604.
