= Tan-1 =

Tan-1, TAN-1, tan-1, or tan^{−1} may refer to:

- tan^{−1}y = tan^{−1}(x), sometimes interpreted as arctan(x) or arctangent of x, the compositional inverse of the trigonometric function tangent (see below for ambiguity)
- tan^{−1}x = tan^{−1}(x), sometimes interpreted as (tan(x))^{−1} = 1/tan(x) = cot(x) or cotangent of x, the multiplicative inverse (or reciprocal) of the trigonometric function tangent (see above for ambiguity)
- tan x^{−1}, sometimes interpreted as tan(x^{−1}) = tan(1/x), the tangent of the multiplicative inverse (or reciprocal) of x (see below for ambiguity)
- tan x^{−1}, sometimes interpreted as (tan(x))^{−1} = 1/tan(x) = cot(x) or cotangent of x, the multiplicative inverse (or reciprocal) of the trigonometric function tangent (see above for ambiguity)

Because of ambiguity, the notation arctan(x) or (tan(x))^{−1}, is recommended.

== See also ==
- Inverse function
- cot^{−1} (disambiguation)
- atan2
