= Loss of heterozygosity =

Loss of the copy of a gene from one parent in a diploid organism

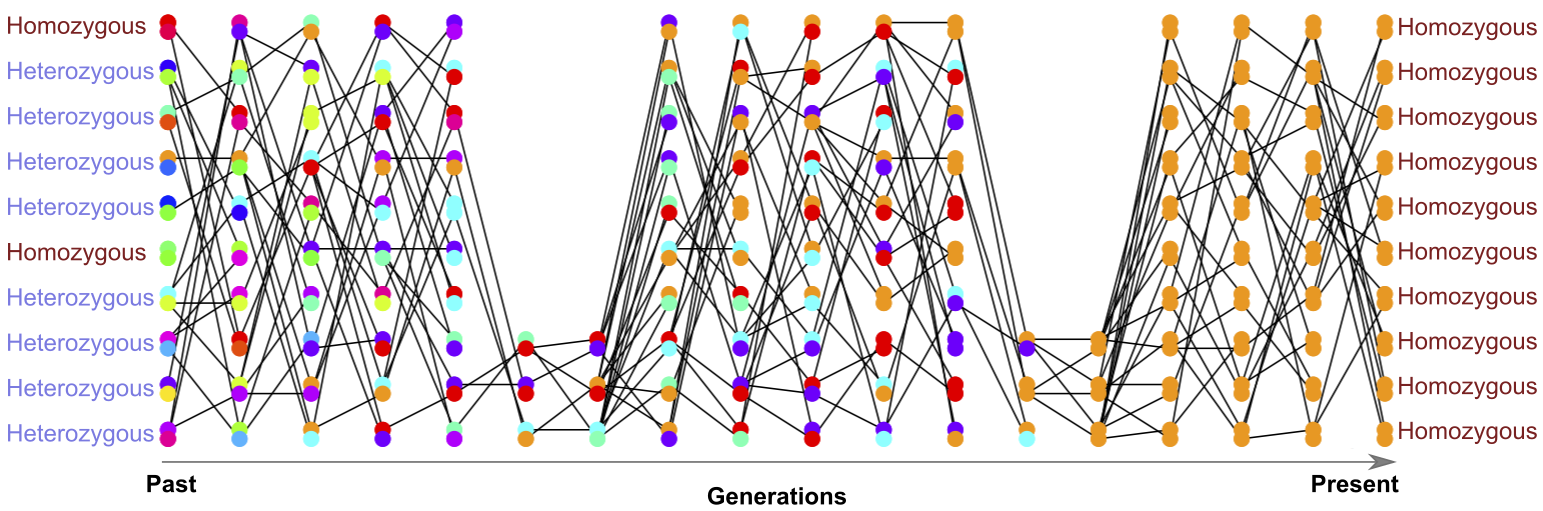
An example of loss of heterozygosity over time, in bottlenecking population. Different alleles painted in different colors. A diploid population of 10 individuals, that bottlenecked down to three individuals repeatedly, resulted in all individuals homozygous.

In genetics, loss of heterozygosity (LOH) is a type of genetic abnormality in diploid organisms in which one copy of an entire gene and its surrounding chromosomal region are lost. Since diploid cells have two copies of their genes, one from each parent, a single copy of the lost gene still remains when this happens, but any heterozygosity (slight differences between the versions of the gene inherited from each parent) is no longer present.

== In cancer ==
The loss of heterozygosity is a common occurrence in cancer development. Originally, a heterozygous state is required and indicates the absence of a functional tumor suppressor gene copy in the region of interest. However, many people remain healthy with such a loss, because there still is one functional gene left on the other chromosome of the chromosome pair. The remaining copy of the tumor suppressor gene can be inactivated by a point mutation or via other mechanisms, resulting in a loss of heterozygosity event, and leaving no tumor suppressor gene to protect the body. Loss of heterozygosity does not imply a homozygous state (which would require the presence of two identical alleles in the cell). The exact targets for LOH are not characterised for all chromosomal losses in cancer, but certain are very well mapped. Some examples are 17p13 loss in multiple cancer types where a copy of TP53 gene gets inactivated, 13q14 loss in retinoblastoma with RB1 gene deletion or 11p13 in Wilms' tumor where WT1 gene is lost. Other commonly lost chromosomal loci are still being investigated in terms of potential tumor suppressors located in those regions.

=== Knudson two-hit hypothesis of tumorigenesis ===
- First Hit: The first hit is classically thought of as a point mutation, but generally arises due to epigenetic events which inactivate one copy of a tumor suppressor gene (TSG), such as Rb1. In hereditary cancer syndromes, individuals are born with the first hit. The individual does not develop cancer at this point because the remaining TSG allele on the other locus is still functioning normally.
- Second Hit: While the second hit is commonly assumed to be a deletion that results in loss of the remaining functioning TSG allele, the original published mechanism of RB1 LOH was mitotic recombination/gene conversion/copy-neutral LOH, not deletion. There is a critical difference between deletion and CN-LOH, as the latter mechanism cannot be detected by comparative genomic hybridization (CGH)-based gene copy number counting, and requires allelic genotyping. Either way, LOH leaves only non-functioning alleles of the TSG, and the individual may go on to develop cancer.

=== Copy-neutral LOH ===
Copy-neutral LOH is thus called because no net change in the copy number occurs in the affected individual. Possible causes for copy-neutral LOH include acquired uniparental disomy (UPD) and gene conversion. In UPD, a person receives two copies of a chromosome, or part of a chromosome, from one parent and no copies from the other parent due to errors in meiosis I or meiosis II. This acquired homozygosity could lead to development of cancer if the individual inherited a non-functional allele of a tumor suppressor gene.

In tumor cells copy-neutral LOH can be biologically equivalent to the second hit in the Knudson hypothesis. Acquired UPD is quite common in both hematologic and solid tumors, and is reported to constitute 20 to 80% of the LOH seen in human tumors. Determination of virtual karyotypes using SNP-based arrays can provide genome-wide copy number and LOH status, including detection of copy-neutral LOH. Copy-neutral LOH cannot be detected by arrayCGH, FISH, or conventional cytogenetics. SNP-based arrays are preferred for virtual karyotyping of tumors and can be performed on fresh or paraffin-embedded tissues.

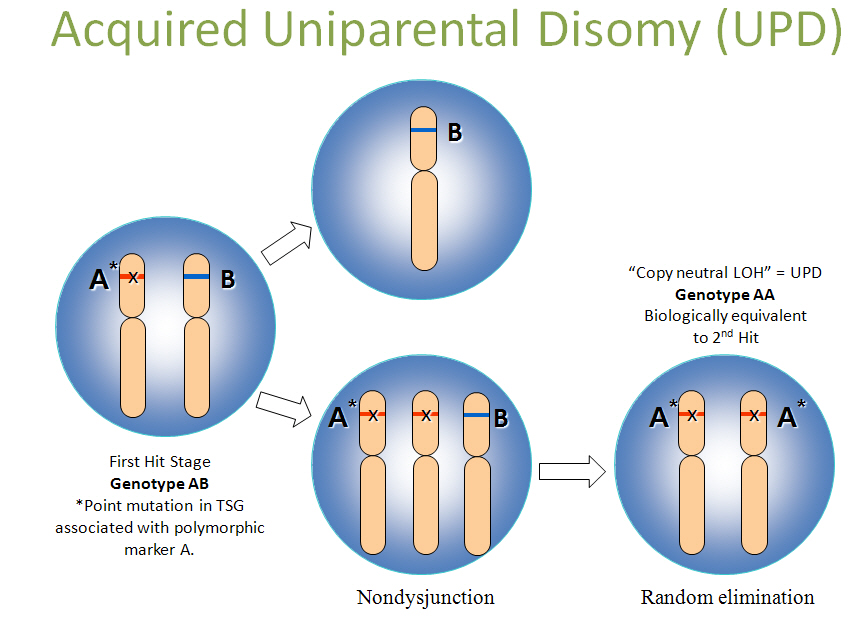
Copy-neutral LOH/uniparental disomy

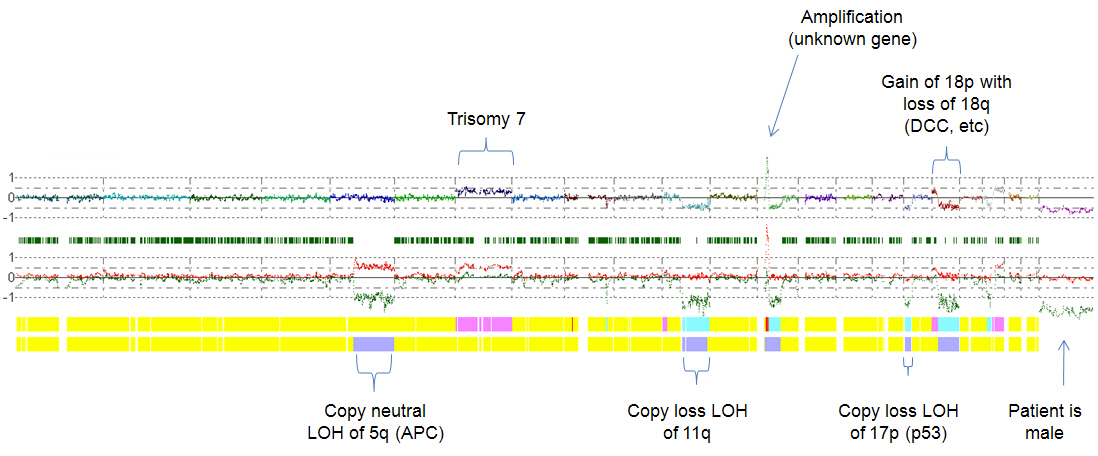
SNP array Virtual karyotype of a colorectal carcinoma (whole genome view) demonstrating deletions, gains, amplifications, and acquired UPD (copy-neutral LOH).

=== Retinoblastoma ===
The classical example of such a loss of protecting genes is hereditary retinoblastoma, in which one parent's contribution of the tumor suppressor Rb1 is flawed. Although most cells will have a functional second copy, chance loss of heterozygosity events in individual cells almost invariably lead to the development of this retinal cancer in the young child.

=== Breast cancer and BRCA1/2 ===
The genes BRCA1 and BRCA2 show loss of heterozygosity in samplings of tumors from patients who have germline mutations. BRCA1/2 are genes that produce proteins which regulate the DNA repair pathway by binding to Rad51.

=== Homologous recombination repair ===
In breast, ovarian, pancreatic, and prostate cancers, a core enzyme employed in homologous recombination repair (HRR) of DNA damage is often defective due to LOH, that is genetic defects in both copies (in the diploid human genome) of the gene encoding an enzyme necessary for HRR. Such LOH in these different cancers was found for DNA repair genes BRCA1, BRCA2, BARD1, PALB2, FANCC, RAD51C and RAD51D. Reduced ability to accurately repair DNA damages by homologous recombination may lead to compensating inaccurate repair, increased mutation and progression to cancer.

== Detection ==
Loss of heterozygosity can be identified in cancers by noting the presence of heterozygosity at a genetic locus in an organism's germline DNA, and the absence of heterozygosity at that locus in the cancer cells. This is often done using polymorphic markers, such as microsatellites or single-nucleotide polymorphisms, for which the two parents contributed different alleles. Genome-wide LOH status of fresh or paraffin embedded tissue samples can be assessed by virtual karyotyping using SNP arrays.

== In asexual organisms ==
It has been proposed that LOH may limit the longevity of asexual organisms. The minor allele in heterozygous areas of the genome is likely to have mild fitness consequences compared to de-novo mutations because selection has had time to remove deleterious alleles. When allelic gene conversion removes the major allele at these sites organisms are likely to experience a mild decline in fitness. Because LOH is much more common than de-novo mutation, and because the fitness consequences are closer to neutrality, this process should drive Muller's ratchet more quickly than de-novo mutations. While this process has received little experimental investigation, it is known that major signature of asexuality in metazoan genomes appears to be genome wide LOH, a sort of anti-meselson effect.

== See also ==
- Inbreeding depression
- Microsatellite instability
- Tumor suppressor gene
- Virtual Karyotype
- Knudson hypothesis
- Deletion (genetics)
