= Genes, Chromosomes & Cancer =

- Discipline: Oncology
- Language: English

Publication details
- History: 1989–present
- Publisher: Wiley-Blackwell
- Frequency: Monthly
- Impact factor: 4.041 (2014)

Standard abbreviations
- ISO 4: Genes Chromosom. Cancer
- NLM: Genes Chromosomes Cancer

Indexing
- ISSN: 1045-2257 (print); 1098-2264 (web)

Links
- Journal homepage

Genes, Chromosomes & Cancer is a monthly peer-reviewed academic journal published by Wiley-Blackwell. According to the Journal Citation Reports, the journal has a 2014 impact factor of 4.041.
