= Amniocyte =

An amniocyte (literally "lamb cell") is a cell of a fetus that is suspended in the amniotic fluid. They come from multiple tissues: the umbilical cord, fetal urinary tract, inner amniotic surface, and fetal skin. They are formed through a process of cellular differentiation and shedding from the embryo and placenta. The embryoblast divides into two layers, the epiblast and hypoblast. Cells from the epiblast and trophoblastic cells form the amniotic cavity and amniotic epithelium. Amniocytes formed during gastrulation go through a process of epithelial to mesenchymal transition (EMT) and ingression of epiblast cells at the primitive streak. The primitive streak is formed at the posterior region of the epiblast. The epiblast cells at the primitive streak then go through EMT, losing the epithelial characteristics and becoming more mesenchymal. These cells then ingress into the embryo and form the germ layers, endoderm, mesoderm, and ectoderm. The cells near the top of the epiblast contribute to the amniotic ectoderm, which then forms the amniotic cavity. The lower cells then form a major part of the three germ layers.

== Characteristics ==
Due to transcriptional regulators, human amniocytes are considered multipotent and pluripotent stem cells. They have large pools of cells that are capable of renewing. Amniocytes also have a distinct phenotype. The stem cell state of amniocytes is different from embryonic stem cells (ESCs) and induced pluripotent stem cells (iPSCs), this being due to their pluripotency factors; they are like ESC state, however, are different due to their true primitive pluripotency.

Amniocytes can be used to study a person's chromosomes, they can be used in DNA-based analysis via microscopic analysis of the cells in amniotic fluid. After circa 16 weeks of pregnancy, the fluid can be collected. It then contains shed fetal cells, which are put in culture and grow out slowly. After around 2 weeks of culture, the cells should have divided enough for proper DNA analysis.

== Medical applications ==
Amniocytes are used in a variety of medical applications. Amniocentesis is one of them. This is used for genetic testing, diagnosis of fetal infection, treatment, and fetal lung testing. Genetic amniocentesis can give information on the baby’s genes. This is usually done between weeks 14 to 20 of the pregnancy (second or third trimester); if done before that, it can lead to pregnancy complications. There are multiple reasons for getting this done, a few of which are getting positive results from a prenatal screening test, typically in the first trimester. If there were previous pregnancies that were affected by genetic issues, getting pregnant at or after the age of 35, because of the age, one could be at a higher risk for genetic issues. If a delivery is going to be before week 39, the amniotic fluid could be tested to make sure the baby's lungs are functioning properly.
