= Genetic imbalance =

Genetic imbalance is to describe situation when the genome of a cell or organism has more copies of some genes than other genes due to chromosomal rearrangements or aneuploidy. Changes in gene dosage, the number of times a given gene is present in the cell nucleus, can create a genetic imbalance.

== Effects ==
This imbalance in gene dosage alters the amount of a particular protein relative to all other proteins, and this alternation in the relative amounts of protein can have a variety of phenotypic effects. These effects are depending on how the proteins function and how critical the maintenance of a precise ratio of proteins is to the survival of the organism.

Diminishing the dosage of most genes produces no obvious change in phenotype. For some genes the phenotypic consequences of a decrease in gene dosage are noticeable but not catastrophic. For example, Drosophila containing only one copy of the wild type Notch gene has visible wing abnormalities but otherwise seems to function normally. For some rare genes, the normal diploid level of gene expression is essential to individual survival; fewer than two copies of such a gene results in lethality. In Drosophila, a single dose of the locus known as Triplolethal is in an otherwise diploid individual.

Although a single dose of any gene may not cause substantial harm to the individual, the genetic imbalance resulting from a single dose of many genes at the same time can be lethal. Humans, for example, cannot survive, even as heterozygotes, with deletions that remove more than about 3% of any part of their haploid genome.
