= Phenol extraction =

DNA and RNA purification procedure

Phenol extraction is a laboratory technique that purifies nucleic acid samples using a phenol solution. Phenol is common reagent in extraction because its properties allow for effective nucleic acid extraction, particularly as it strongly denatures proteins, it is a nucleic acid preservative, and it is immiscible in water.

It may also refer to the process of extracting and isolating phenols from raw materials such as coal tar. These purified phenols are used in many industrial and medical compounds and are used as precursors in some synthesis reactions.

== Phenol extraction of nucleic acids ==
Phenol (C_{6}H_{5}OH) is a water-soluble compound consisting of a phenyl group (-C_{6}H_{5}) bonded to a hydroxyl group (-OH).

Phenol extraction is a widely used technique for purifying nucleic acid samples from cell lysates. To obtain nucleic acids, the cell must be lysed, and the nucleic acids separated from other cell components.

Phenol is a polar substance with a higher density than water (1.07 g/cm^{3} compared to water's 1.00 g/cm^{3}). When suspended in a water-phenol solution, denatured proteins and unwanted cell components dissolve in the phenol, while polar nucleic acids dissolve in the water phase. The solution may then be centrifuged to separate the phenol and water into distinct organic and aqueous phases. Purified nucleic acids can be precipitated from the aqueous phase of the solution.

Phenol is often used in combination with chloroform. Adding an equal volume of chloroform and phenol ensures a distinct separation between the aqueous and organic phases. Chloroform and phenol are miscible and create a denser solution than phenol alone, aiding the separation of the organic and aqueous layers. This addition of chloroform is useful when removing the aqueous phase to obtain a purified nucleic acid sample.

The pH of the solution must be adjusted specifically for each type of extraction. For DNA extraction, the pH is adjusted to 7.0–8.0. For RNA-specific extraction, the pH is adjusted to 4.5. At pH 4.5, hydrogen ions neutralize the negative charges on the phosphate groups, causing DNA to dissolve in the organic phase while allowing RNA to be isolated separately in the aqueous phase.

== See also ==
- Phenol-chloroform extraction
