= Gene Wiki =

Human genes project within Wikipedia

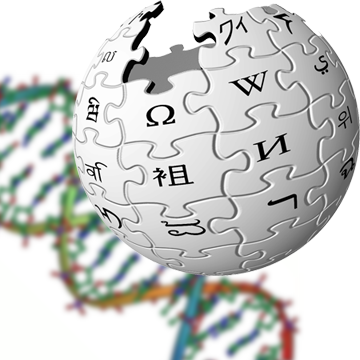
Logo of Gene Wiki

The Gene Wiki is a project within Wikipedia that aims to describe the relationships and functions of all human genes. It was established to transfer information from scientific resources to Wikipedia stub articles.

The Gene Wiki project also initiated publication of gene-specific review articles in the journal Gene, together with the editing of the gene-specific pages in Wikipedia.

The Gene Wiki project in collaboration with the journal Gene was terminated in May 2022, ten years after the project's initiation. A report by the project's leaders summarizes the project's achievements.

== Project goals and scope ==
=== Number of gene articles ===
The human genome contains an estimated 20,000–25,000 protein-coding genes. The goal of the Gene Wiki project is to create seed articles for every notable human gene, that is, every gene whose function has been assigned in the peer-reviewed scientific literature. Approximately half of human genes have assigned function, therefore the total number of articles seeded by the Gene Wiki project would be expected to be in the range of 10,000–15,000. To date, approximately 11,000 articles have been created or augmented to include Gene Wiki project content.

=== Expansion ===
Once seed articles have been established, the expectation is that these will be annotated and expanded by editors ranging in experience from the lay audience to students to professionals and academics.

=== Proteins encoded by genes ===
Only a small portion of the genome actually encodes protein in the human genome. Understanding the function of a gene that codes for a protein generally requires understanding of the function of the corresponding protein. In addition to including basic information about the gene, the project therefore also includes information about the protein encoded by the gene. The function of other portions of the genome, non-coding DNA, also called "junk" DNA in the past because they had no apparent function, actually are thought to have regulatory functions.

== Gene wiki generated content ==
Stubs for the Gene Wiki project are created by a bot and contain links to the following primary gene/protein databases:

- HUGO Gene Nomenclature Committee – official gene name
- Entrez – Gene database
- OMIM (Mendelian Inheritance in Man) – database that catalogues all the known diseases with a genetic component
- Amigo – Gene Ontology
- HomoloGene – gene homologs in other species
- SymAtlasRNA – gene expression pattern in tissues
- Protein Data Bank – 3D structure of protein encoded by the gene
- UniProt (universal protein resource) – a central repository of protein data

== Response ==
A report found that between 2013 and 2017, the content which Gene Wiki contributed to Wikipedia got crowdsourced development over time.
