= Z0 =

Z0, Z_{0} or Z^{0} may refer to:

- Characteristic impedance, a ratio used in electronics
- Impedance of free space, a physical constant
- Z boson, an elementary particle that mediates the weak force
- a rare rail transport modelling scale
- Roughness length, a factor used in wind speed calculations
- Z0 sex-determination system in some moth species, also referring to biological females under this system

== See also ==
- 0Z (disambiguation)
