= 0Z =

0Z (zero Z) or 0-Z may refer to:

- 0Z, or zero protons; see Atomic number
- 0z, notation for no degree of redshift
- 0Z, a data set in statistics where the Standard score is zero
- 0Z, a Compressibility factor or zero

== See also ==
- Z0 (disambiguation)
