= ZO sex-determination system =

Biological system in certain moths

The ZO sex-determination system is a system that determines the sex of offspring in caddisflies and several moths. In those species, there is one sex chromosome, Z. Males have two Z chromosomes, whereas females have one Z. Males are ZZ, while females are ZO.

The ancestor of Lepidoptera and Trichoptera had ZO sex determination, which became a ZW sex-determination system in the largest clade, Ditrysia, as well as in Tischerioidea.

Some of the ZW species later reverted to the ZO system.

In 2025 coleoid cephalopods (octopuses, squids, and cuttlefishes) were revealed to have a ZO sex chromosome system.

== See also ==
- Y-chromosomal Adam
- Sex determination in Silene
- Sex-determination system
- Sexual differentiation
- Haplodiploid sex-determination system
- XY sex-determination system
- XO sex-determination system
- Temperature-dependent sex determination
- X chromosome
- Y chromosome
