= Sex-determination system =

Biological system that determines the development of an organism's sex

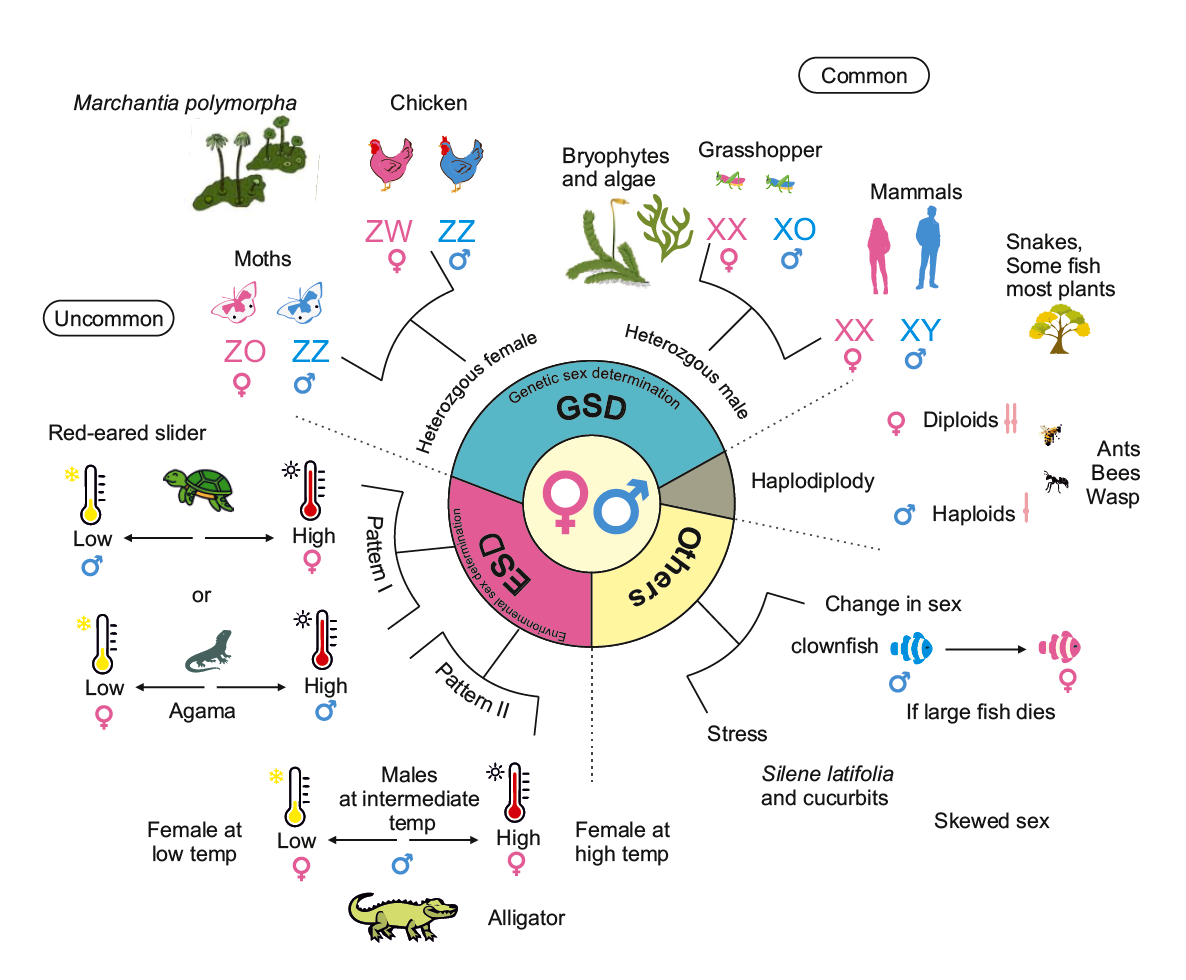
Sex can be determined genetically such as by systems of chromosomes, by environmental factors such as temperature, or by other factors.

A sex-determination system is a biological system that determines the development of an organism's sex. Most organisms that create their offspring using sexual reproduction have two sexes, males and females. In other species there are hermaphrodites, organisms that can function as female, male, or both.

In some species, only one sex is present, temporarily or permanently. This can be due to parthenogenesis, where a female reproduces without fertilization, mostly seen in plants. In some plants or algae the gametophyte stage may reproduce itself, thus producing more individuals of the same sex as the parent.

Sex determination is often genetic: males and females have different alleles or even different genes that specify their sexual morphology. In animals, this is often accompanied by chromosomal differences through combinations of XY, ZW, XO, ZO chromosomes, or by haplodiploidy. The sexual differentiation is triggered by a main gene (a "sex locus"), with a multitude of other genes following in a domino effect. In other cases, the sex of a fetus is determined by environmental variables such as temperature.

Some plants and fish do not have a fixed sex, but instead go through life cycles and change sex based on genetic cues during life stages of their type. This could be due to environmental factors such as seasons and temperature.

== Discovery ==
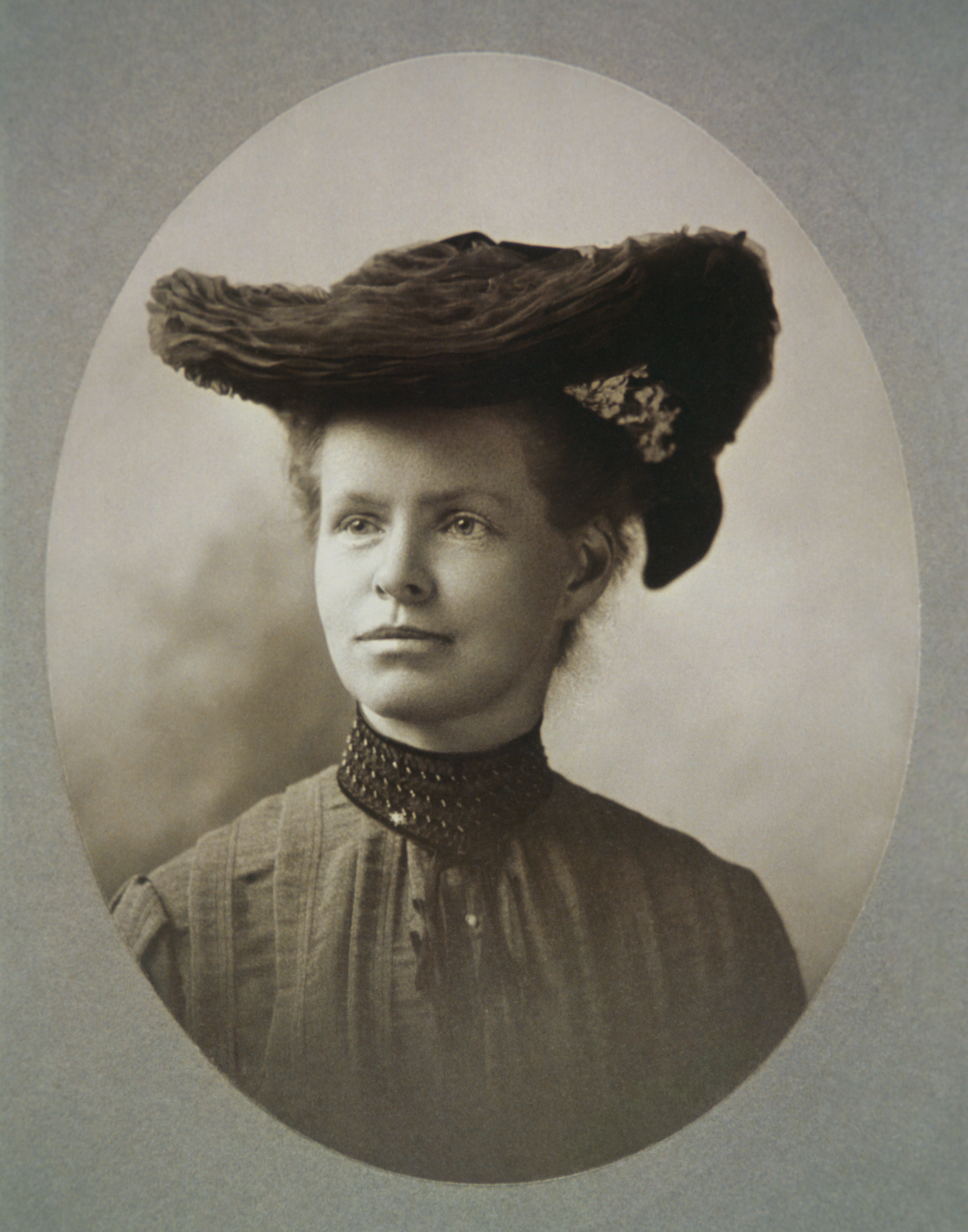
In 1905, American geneticist Nettie Stevens demonstrated that sex in mealworms is determined by X and Y chromosomes.

In 1694, the German botanist Rudolf Jakob Camerarius conducted experiments on pollination, during which he identified the existence of distinct male and female reproductive structures in plants, including maize. In 1866, Austrian monk Gregor Mendel published his work on the inheritance of traits in pea plants. These findings—now known as Mendelian inheritance—introduced the concept of heritable units (genes) passed from two gametes, and eventually became the foundation of modern genetics. In 1902, American zoologist Clarence Erwin McClung suggested that sex chromosomes might play a central role in determining sex, based on cytological studies in insects.

In 1905, American geneticist Nettie Stevens demonstrated that sex is determined by specific chromosomes, now known as the X and Y chromosomes, in the mealworm (Tenebrio molitor). In 1917, botanist Charles Elmer Allen extended this understanding to the plant kingdom by discovering sex chromosomes in plants. In 1922, geneticist Calvin Bridges introduced the genic balance theory, based on experiments with Drosophila melanogaster fruit flies. He proposed that the ratio of X chromosomes to sets of autosomes (the other chromosomes) determines sexual development, adding complexity to the XY system. In 1928, Swiss biologist Fritz Baltzer described environmental sex determination, showing that external environmental factors, such as temperature, influenced the development of sex in some species.

== Chromosomal systems ==
Major chromosomal sex determination systems are XY, XO, ZW, and ZO, but there are numerous exceptions. According to the Tree of Sex database (as of 2023), the known sex determination systems in vertebrates, insects, and angiosperms are:

Sex determination systems in vertebrates, insects and angiosperms
| Taxonomic group | XY | XO | ZW | ZO | Other^{1} | XO/XY ratio | ZO/ZW ratio |
|---|---|---|---|---|---|---|---|
| Vertebrates | 722 | 15 | 480 | 3 | 254 | 0.02 | 0.01 |
| Insects | 4415 | 1857 | 37 | 25 | 156 | 0.42 | 0.68 |
| Angiosperms | 23 | 0 | 1 | 0 | 19 | 0.00 | 0.00 |
| Total | 5160 | 1872 | 518 | 28 | 429 | 0.36 | 0.05 |

^{1. complex sex chromosomes, homomorphic sex chromosomes, or others}

=== XY system ===
The fruit fly Drosophila, like humans and most mammals, uses an XY sex-determination system.

The XY sex-determination system is found in humans and most other mammals, as well as in some insect species. In the XY system, females have two X chromosomes (XX), while males have a single X and a single Y chromosome (XY). The X and Y sex chromosomes are different in shape and size from each other, unlike other chromosome pairs (autosomes), and are sometimes called allosomes. In some species, including humans, individuals remain phenotypically undifferentiated for some time during development (embryogenesis); in others, such as Drosophila fruit flies, sexual differentiation occurs as soon as fertilization occurs. The Drosophila Y chromosome has a different history from the mammalian Y chromosome, with many of its genes derived from autosomes, not from an X chromosome.

==== Y-centered ====
Human male X and Y chromosomes, presented using the G banding staining method. The Y chromosome is smaller than the X.

Some species (including humans) have a gene SRY on the Y chromosome that triggers development of the male phenotype. Members of SRY-reliant species can also have other chromosomal combinations such as XXY. In humans, karyotypic sex is determined by the presence or absence of a Y chromosome with a functional SRY gene. If the SRY gene is present and activated during fetal development, cells create testosterone and anti-müllerian hormone, leading to the development of a male phenotype. In embryos that lack a functioning SRY gene, such as most XX individuals, the individual develops as a female.

In Y-centered sex determination, the SRY gene triggers male phenotype development, but multiple genes are required for this process to complete. In XY mice, lack of the gene DAX1 on the X chromosome results in sterility, but in humans it causes adrenal hypoplasia congenita. However, when an extra DAX1 gene is placed on the X chromosome, the result is phenotypically female, despite the existence of SRY, since the extra gene overrides the effects of SRY. Even when there are functional X chromosomes in XX females, duplication or expression of the SOX9 gene causes testes to develop. Gradual sex reversal in developed mice can occur when the gene FOXL2 is removed from females. Even though the gene DMRT1 is used by birds as their sex locus, species with XY chromosomes also rely upon DMRT1, on chromosome 9, for sexual differentiation at some point in their formation.

==== X-centered ====
Some species, such as fruit flies, use the presence of two X chromosomes to determine femaleness.

==== Other variants ====
Some fish have variants of the XY sex-determination system, as well as the regular system. For example, while having an XY format, the swordtail fishes Xiphophorus nezahualcoyotl and X. milleri have a second Y chromosome, known as Y', that creates XY' females and YY' males.

=== X0 system ===
The XO sex-determination system, where 'O' means no X chromosome; the animals have two complete sets of autosomes (all the other chromosomes).

In the X0 system, a variant of the XY mechanism, females have two copies of the sex chromosome (XX) but males have only one (X0), i.e. the second sex chromosome is absent so the male has one fewer chromosome than the female. In this method, the sex is determined by the quantity of genes expressed across the two chromosomes. This system is used in insects including the grasshoppers and crickets of order Orthoptera and in the cockroaches (order Blattodea). A small number of mammals use the X0 system, including the Amami spiny rat (Tokudaia osimensis) and the Tokunoshima spiny rat (Tokudaia tokunoshimensis), and the shrew Sorex araneus. Transcaucasian mole voles (Ellobius lutescens) have a different form of XO determination, in which both sexes lack a second sex chromosome.

The nematode Caenorhabditis elegans is male with one sex chromosome (X0); with a pair of chromosomes (XX) it is a hermaphrodite. Its main sex gene is XOL, which encodes XOL-1 and controls the expression of the genes TRA-2 and HER-1. These genes reduce male gene activation and increase it, respectively.

=== ZW system ===
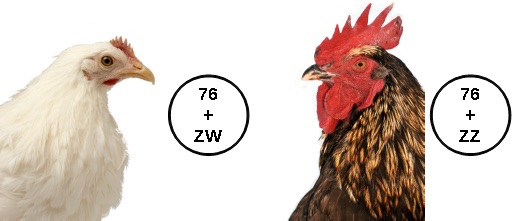
ZW sex determination in birds

The ZW sex-determination system is found in birds, some reptiles, and some insects and other organisms. Here the mechanism is the reverse of the XY system: females have two different kinds of sex chromosomes (ZW), and males have two of the same kind of sex chromosomes (ZZ). In the chicken, this depends on the expression of the DMRT1 gene. In birds, the genes FET1 and ASW are found on the W chromosome for females, similar to how the Y chromosome contains SRY. However, not all species depend upon the W for their sex. For example, there are moths and butterflies that are ZW, but some are female with ZO, or female with ZZW. Also, while mammals deactivate one of their extra X chromosomes when female, it appears that in the case of Lepidoptera, the males produce double the normal amount of enzymes, due to having two Z's. Because the use of ZW sex determination is varied, it is still unknown how exactly most species determine their sex. However, the silkworm Bombyx mori uses a single female-specific piRNA as the primary determiner of sex. Despite the similarities between the ZW and XY systems, these sex chromosomes evolved separately. In the case of the chicken, their Z chromosome is more similar to humans' autosome 9. The chicken's Z chromosome seems to be related to the X chromosome of the platypus. When a ZW species, such as the Komodo dragon, reproduces parthenogenetically, usually only males are produced. This is because the haploid eggs double their chromosomes, resulting in ZZ or WW. The ZZ become males, but the WW are not viable and are not brought to term.

In both XY and ZW sex determination systems, the sex chromosome carrying the critical factors is often much reduced in size, carrying little more than the genes necessary for triggering the development of a given sex.

=== Z0 system ===
The Z0 sex-determination system is found in some moths. In these insects there is one sex chromosome, Z. Males have two Z chromosomes, whereas females have only one. Males are ZZ, while females are Z0.

=== UV system ===
Some species of bryophytes and algae are dioicous, meaning that the haploid (one set of chromosomes) gametophyte stage of the life cycle occurs as separate male and female gamete-producing individuals. When meiosis occurs in the diploid (two sets of chromosomes) sporophyte generation of the life cycle, the sex chromosomes known as U and V assort in spores. Each spore carries either the U chromosome and gives rise to a female gametophyte, or the V chromosome and gives rise to a male gametophyte.

Life cycle with UV system in a liverwort

UV sex-determination system in some bryophytes and algae. Haploid gametophytes are female if they have the U chromosome, and male if they have the V chromosome.

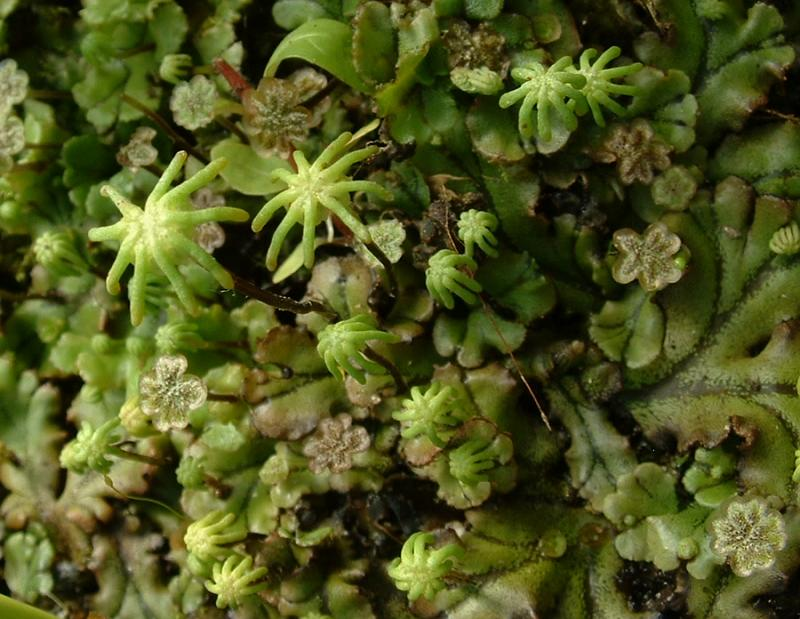
Marchantia polymorpha, a liverwort with antheridia (shorter rosette structures) and archegonia (taller palm-like structures) on stalks on separate male and female gametophytes (flat green thalli). The sporophyte develops inside the archegonium.

=== Mating types ===
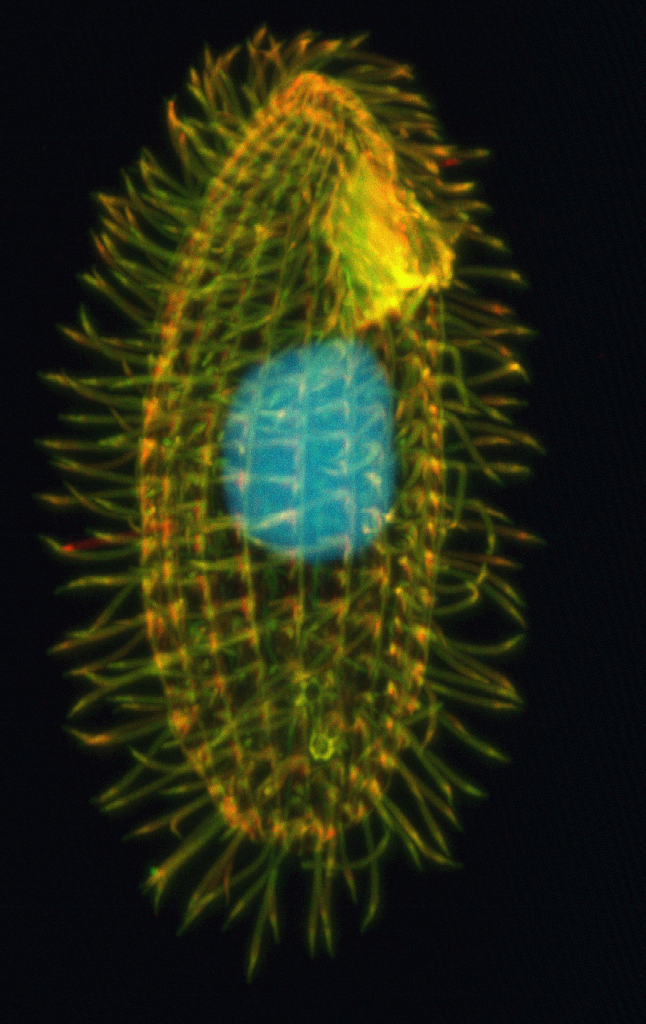
The ciliate Tetrahymena has seven mating types.

The mating type in microorganisms is analogous to sex in multi-cellular organisms; mating takes place only between different mating types. Some species have more than two mating types: for instance, Tetrahymena, a ciliate, has seven.

Among fungi, mating type is determined by chromosomal regions called mating-type loci. Furthermore, it is not as simple as "two different mating types can mate", but rather, a matter of combinatorics. For instance, most basidiomycetes have a 'tetrapolar heterothallism' mating system: there are two loci, and mating between two individuals is possible only if the alleles on both loci are different. For example, if there were 3 alleles per locus, then there would be 9 mating types, each of which could mate with 4 other mating types.

=== Haplodiploidy ===
Haplodiploidy is found in the hymenopteran insects, namely the ants, bees, and wasps. Sex determination is controlled by the zygosity of a complementary sex determiner (csd) locus. Unfertilized eggs develop into haploid individuals which have a single, hemizygous copy of the csd locus and are therefore males. Fertilized eggs develop into diploid individuals which, due to high variability in the csd locus, are usually heterozygous females. In rare instances diploid individuals are homozygous, and develop into sterile males. The gene acting as a csd locus has been identified in the honeybee, and several candidate genes have been proposed as a csd locus for other hymenopterans. Most hymenopteran females can decide the sex of their offspring by holding received sperm in their spermatheca and either releasing it into their oviduct or not. This allows them to create more workers, depending on the status of the colony.

The complementary sex determination mechanism in bees uses multiple alleles of a single gene, csd.

=== Polygenic ===
In polygenic sex determination, sex is primarily determined by genes on multiple non-homologous chromosomes. The environment may have a minor influence. Examples include African cichlid fish (Metriaclima spp.), lemmings (Myopus schisticolor), the green swordtail fish, and Japanese rice fish. In this mechanism, one system is often dominant over another if in conflict. For example, in some cichlid fish from Lake Malawi, if an individual has both the XY locus (on one chromosome pair) and the WZ locus (on another chromosome pair), the W is dominant and the individual is female.

The sex-determination system of zebrafish is polygenic. Juvenile zebrafishes (0–30 days after hatching) have both ovary-like tissue and testis tissue. They develop into male or female adults, their sex based on a complex interaction of genes on multiple chromosomes, unaffected by environmental variations.

=== By non-coding RNA ===
In many insects, sex is determined by a long non-coding RNA, ANTSR, first described in ants. Ants that are heterozygous at the ANTSR locus become females, while homozygous (and hemizygous) embryos become males: this explains how sex determination works in a haplodiploid system. The ANTSR system has been maintained for over 150 million years but is evolving rapidly, resulting in the loss of sequence similarity among many species that use it.

=== Other chromosomal systems ===
When there are two sex chromosomes, they can be heteromorphic or homomorphic. The two familiar kinds of sex chromosome pairs (XY and ZW) are heteromorphic. Homomorphic sex chromosomes are almost identical in size and gene content. Homomorphic sex chromosomes exist among pufferfish, ratite birds, pythons, and European tree frogs. Some are quite old, meaning that there is some evolutionary force that resists their differentiation. For example, three species of European tree frogs have homologous, homomorphic sex chromosomes, and this homomorphism has been maintained for at least 5.4 million years by occasional recombination.

Nematoceran flies, particularly simuliid blackflies and chironomid midges, have sex determination regions that are labile, meaning that one species may have the sex determination region in one chromosome, but a closely related species might have the same region moved to a different non-homologous chromosome. Some species even have the sex determination region different among individuals within the same species (intraspecific variation).

The New Zealand frog, Leiopelma hochstetteri, uses a supernumerary sex chromosome. With zero of that chromosome, the frog develops into a male. With one or more, the frog develops into a female. One female had as many as 16 of that chromosome.

Different populations of the Japanese wrinkled frog Rana rugosa use different systems. Two use homomorphic male heterogamety, one uses XX/XY, and one uses ZZ/ZW. Remarkably, the X and Z chromosomes are homologous, and the Y and W as well. Dmrt1 is on autosome 1 and is not sex-linked. This means that an XX female individual is genetically similar to a ZZ male individual, as is an XY male individual to a ZW female individual. The mechanism behind this is unclear, but it is hypothesized that during its recent evolution, the XY-to-ZW transition has occurred twice.

Clarias gariepinus, the African sharptooth catfish, uses both XX/XY and ZW/ZZ systems, with some populations using homomorphic XX/XY while others use heteromorphic ZW/ZZ. A population in Thailand appears to use both systems simultaneously, possibly because the species was not native to Thailand, and two source populations were introduced, resulting in a mixture.

The platypus, a monotreme, has a sex determination scheme that in some ways resembles that of the ZW sex chromosomes of birds, and lacks the SRY gene. The platypus has ten sex chromosomes $X_1$ to $X_5$ and $Y_1$ to $Y_5$. The males have all ten, $X_1X_2X_3X_4X_5$ $Y_1Y_2Y_3Y_4Y_5$, while females have two sets of the five X chromosomes, $X_1X_2X_3X_4X_5$ $X_1X_2X_3X_4X_5$. During meiosis, 5 Xs form one chain, and 5 Ys form another chain. Thus, they behave effectively as an XY chromosomal system, except each of X and Y is broken into 5 parts; the effect is that recombinations occur very frequently at 4 particular points.

Multiple sex chromosome systems like those of the platypus also occur in bony fish. Some moths and butterflies have $W_1W_2Z \text {♀}/ZZ \text{♂}$ or $WZ_1Z_2 \text {♀}/Z_1Z_1Z_2Z_2 \text{♂}$.

The Southern platyfish has a complex sex determination system involving 3 sex chromosomes and 4 autosomal alleles.

The frog Gastrotheca pseustes from Ecuador has $XY_b \text {♀} / XY_a \text{♂}$ C-banding heteromorphism, meaning that both males and females have XY chromosomes, but their Y chromosomes are different on one or more C-bands. The frog Strabomantis biporcatus from Venezuela has a $\mathrm{X}_1 \mathrm{X}_1 \mathrm{X}_2 \mathrm{X}_2 \text {♀} / \mathrm{X}_1 \mathrm{X}_2 \mathrm{Y} \text{♂}$ system.

== In plants ==
In contrast to most animals, the majority of flowering plants (angiosperms) are co-sexual: individual plants produce bisexual (perfect) flowers that contain both stamens and carpels, or they are monoecious, bearing separate male and female flowers on the same individual. Species in which male and female flowers occur on different individuals (dioecy) are comparatively uncommon, accounting for roughly 5-6% of angiosperm species, although the trait is distributed across about 43% of all plant families.

Unlike the single, ancient origin of the XY system of most mammals, dioecy in plants has arisen independently many times - by some estimates between 870 and 5,000 separate origins - and many of these are evolutionarily recent. This makes plants especially useful systems for studying how genetic sex determination and sex chromosomes arise from co-sexual ancestors.

=== Evolution of separate sexes ===
A central conclusion of theoretical work is that evolving separate sexes from a co-sexual ancestor requires at least two mutations, and that at least one of them involves a developmental trade-off in which losing one sexual function improves the other. Population-genetic models predict that females should become established in a population before males.

Two broad genetic models are commonly contrasted. In the two-gene (or 'two-factor') model – historically associated with the white campion (Silene latifolia) – one mutation disables male function, producing female (male-sterile) plants and initially, a gynodioecious population, while a second mutation suppresses female function to create males. Because recombination between these two genes would generate sterile or hermaphroditic offspring, natural selection favors their close linkage, and suppression of recombination between them defines a nascent Y chromosome. Classic deletion mapping of the Silene latifolia Y chromosome provided early evidence for a Y-linked female-suppressing factor together with separate genes required for male fertility.

In the single-gene (or “one-factor”) model, a single master regulator controls sex: its presence directs development toward one sex, and its absence yields the “default” sex. This model was confirmed by the discovery of a single-gene system in persimmon. The two models differ in their consequences for reversal to co-sexuality: loss of the female-suppressing gene in a two-gene system readily regenerates hermaphrodites, whereas reverting a single-gene system is more difficult, because the sex-determining gene must actively suppress the opposite sexual function.

=== Plant sex chromosomes ===
Many dioecious plants have only recently evolved sex chromosomes, and their X and Y chromosomes are frequently homomorphic – indistinguishable under the microscope – with only a small, completely sex-linked region. In other lineages, such as in Silene latifolia or hemp (Cannabis sativa), the sex chromosomes are strongly heteromorphic, resembling the ancient sex chromosomes of mammals and birds, with one member of the pair being repeat-rich, gene-poor and partly heterochromatic. Male heterogamety (an XY system) is the most common arrangement, but female heterogamety (a ZW system) occurs in some taxa, including the wild strawberries (Fragaria) and Pistacia.

Once recombination between the sex chromosomes is suppressed in the region containing the sex-determining genes, the non-recombining Y-linked (or W-linked) region tends to accumulate transposable elements and other repetitive sequences, may form heterochromatin, and undergoes genetic degeneration as deleterious mutations build up and functional genes are lost or become pseudogenes. Regions in which the sex chromosomes still recombine are termed pseudo-autosomal regions, and successive events that progressively suppress recombination can create “evolutionary strata” of differing divergence. In some plants the sex-determining genes lie within large, naturally low-recombining peri-centromeric regions, so that an extensive non-recombining region can arise without any newly evolved suppression of recombination.

A distinct situation occurs in plants with a dominant haploid (gametophyte) stage, such as many bryophytes. Their sex chromosomes, designated U (female-determining) and V (male-determining), recombine only in the diploid sporophyte; both are therefore expected to accumulate repetitive sequences and to degenerate, as observed in the liverwort Marchantia polymorpha.

=== Genes that determine sex in plants ===
Because dioecy evolved independently in many lineages, the genes underlying sex determination differ among species; several have now been identified using genome sequencing and gene editing.

In diploid persimmon (Diospyros lotus), sex is governed by a single Y-encoded factor, OGI, which is a duplicate of an autosomal gene, MeGI. OGI gives rise to a small RNA that represses MeGI; because high MeGI activity promotes female development, its suppression by OGI produces males, while females are the default sex.

Kiwifruit (Actinidia) has a two-gene system comprising Shy Girl (SyGI), a cytokinin-response-regulator gene that suppresses female (carpel) development, and Friendly Boy (FrBy), which maintains male function and is expressed in the anther tapetum. Both genes lie within a small male-specific region of the Y chromosome.

In garden asparagus (Asparagus officinalis), two tightly linked Y-encoded genes act together: a male-promoting gene related to the Arabidopsis tapetal regulator TDF1, and SOFF (Suppressor Of Female Function), whose disruption yields hermaphrodites. Deletion of both genes is required to convert males to females, consistent with the two-gene model.

In grapevine (Vitis), the sex-determining region carries candidate genes for both functions - VviINP1, associated with male sterility, and the transcription factor VviYABBY3, associated with female function. The cultivated, hermaphroditic grapevine is thought to have arisen from its dioecious wild ancestor through a rare recombination event within this region during domestication.

Other identified or candidate sex determinants include an ARR17-like gene duplicate that acts as a male-determining factor in poplars (Populus), apparently by suppressing female development much as in the persimmon system; a SHORT VEGETATIVE PHASE-like female-suppressing candidate on the hermaphrodite-determining Yh chromosome of papaya (Carica papaya); and an insertion-type male-determining region in spinach. A recurring theme across these systems is that the sex-determining genes arose through gene duplication followed by acquisition of a new function (neo-functionalization).

== Environmental systems ==
=== Temperature-dependent ===
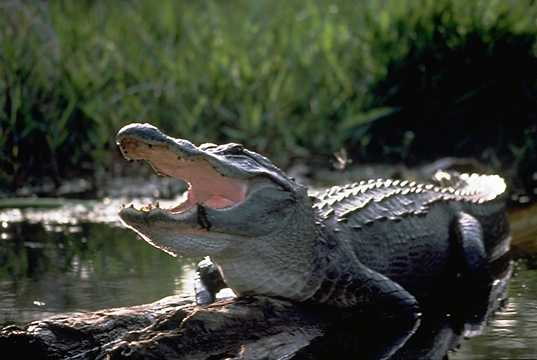
All alligators determine the sex of their offspring by the temperature of the nest.

Many other sex-determination systems exist. In some species of reptiles, including alligators, some turtles, and the tuatara, sex is determined by the temperature at which the egg is incubated during a temperature-sensitive period. There are no examples of temperature-dependent sex determination (TSD) in birds. Megapodes had formerly been thought to exhibit this phenomenon, but were found to actually have different temperature-dependent embryo mortality rates for each sex. For some species with TSD, sex determination is achieved by exposure to hotter temperatures resulting in the offspring being one sex and cooler temperatures resulting in the other. This type of TSD is called Pattern I. For others species using TSD, it is exposure to temperatures on both extremes that results in offspring of one sex, and exposure to moderate temperatures that results in offspring of the opposite sex, called Pattern II TSD. The specific temperatures required to produce each sex are known as the female-promoting temperature and the male-promoting temperature. When the temperature stays near the threshold during the temperature sensitive period, the sex ratio is varied between the two sexes. Some species' temperature standards are based on when a particular enzyme is created. These species that rely upon temperature for their sex determination do not have the SRY gene, but have other genes such as DAX1, DMRT1, and SOX9 that are expressed or not expressed depending on the temperature. The sex of some species, such as the Nile tilapia, Australian skink lizard, and Australian dragon lizard, has an initial bias, set by chromosomes, but can later be changed by the temperature of incubation.

It is unknown how exactly temperature-dependent sex determination evolved. It could have evolved through certain sexes being more suited to certain areas that fit the temperature requirements. For example, a warmer area could be more suitable for nesting, so more females are produced to increase the amount that nest next season. In amniotes, environmental sex determination preceded the genetically determined systems of birds and mammals; it is thought that a temperature-dependent amniote was the common ancestor of all amniotes with sex chromosomes.

=== Other environmental systems ===
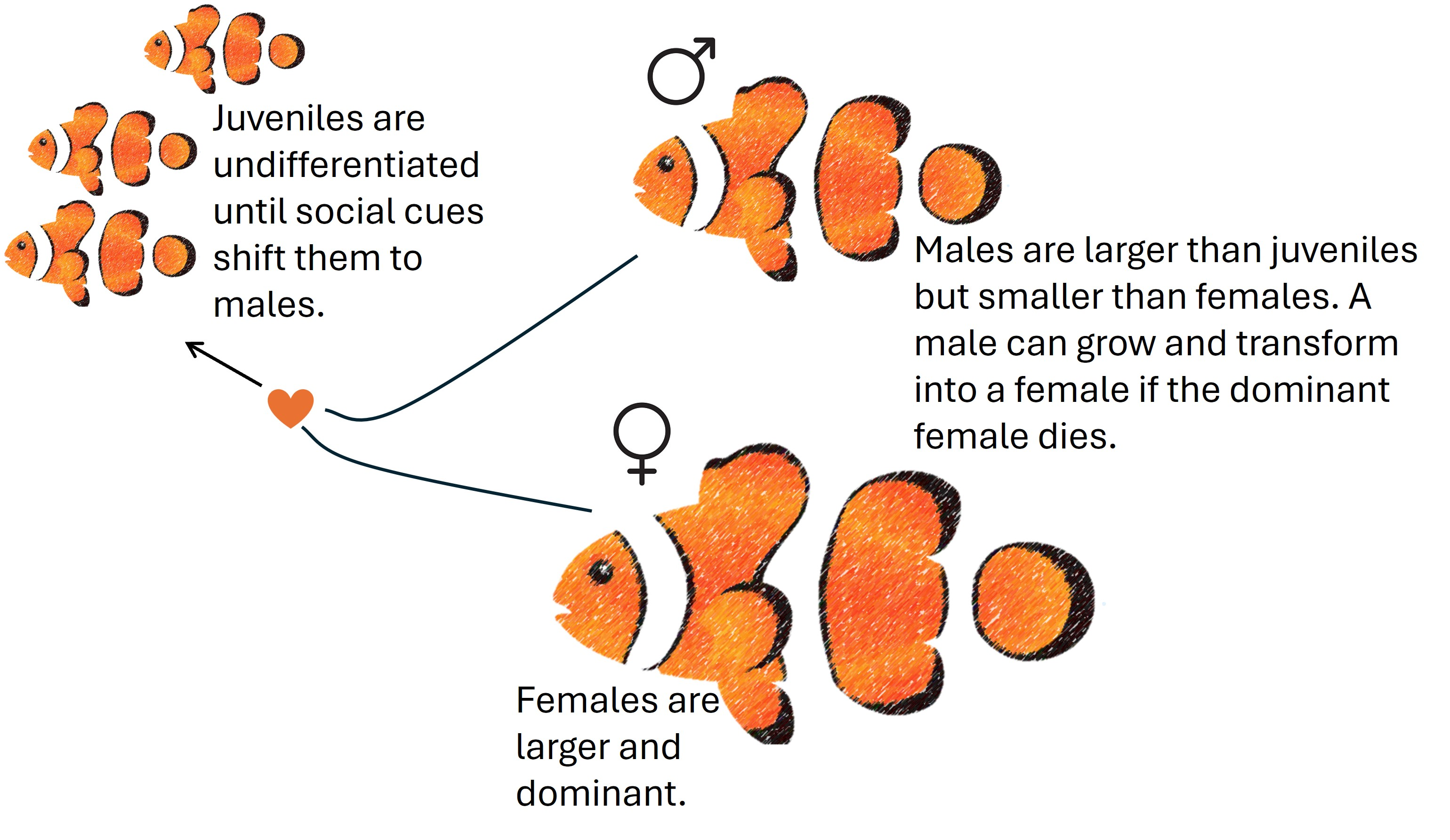
Environmental sex determination in clownfish

Other environmental sex determination systems include location-dependent determination systems, as in the marine worm Bonellia viridis: its larvae become males if they make physical contact with a female, and females if they end up on the bare sea floor. This is triggered by the presence of a chemical produced by the females, bonellin. Some species, such as some fishes, practice sex change: adults start out male, then become female. In tropical clownfish, the dominant individual in a group becomes female while the other ones are male. Clownfish live in colonies of several small undifferentiated fish and two large fish (male and female). The male and female are the only sexually mature fish to reproduce. Clownfish are protandrous hermaphrodites, which means after they mature into males, they eventually can transform into females. They develop undifferentiated until they are needed to fill a certain role in their environment, i.e., if they receive the social and environmental cues to do so.

== Other mechanisms ==
=== Cytoplasmic sex determination ===
Reproductive parasites are endosymbiotic bacteria that live inside the cytoplasm of hosts, that are vertically transmitted from mother to children, and that manipulate the sex ratio of host offspring. This works by the endosymbiont making itself prevalent, regardless of what the pre-existing host sex-determination mechanisms are present, solely by favouring whatever sex is more beneficial for transmission.

Cytoplasmic sex determination via endosymbionts, such as Wolbachia, Spiroplasma, Cardinium and Rickettsia, exists in arthropod and nematode species. Different reproductive parasites can alter the reproductive abilities of their hosts by means including cytoplasmic incompatibility, parthenogenesis, feminization and embryonic male killing.

Mitochondrial male sterility: In many flowering plants, the mitochondria can cause hermaphrodite individuals to be unable to father offspring, effectively turning them into exclusive females. This is a form of mother's curse. It is an evolutionarily adaptive strategy for mitochondria, since they are inherited exclusively from mother to offspring. The first published case of mitochondrial male sterility among metazoans was reported in 2022 in the hermaphroditic snail Physa acuta.

=== Paternal genome elimination ===
In some species of insects, springtails, and mites, male offspring lose their paternal genome (in whole or in part) during development or in the germline. Males can be diploid, diploid with missing sex chromosome, functionally haploid or truly haploid, depending on the mechanism of elimination.

=== Monogeny ===
In monogenic reproduction, mothers produce single-sex broods. It is observed in species of Hymenoptera (ants, bees and wasps), particularly those exhibiting eusocial population structure. Though this mechanism is not limited to eusociality and is also exhibited in other insects (Diptera) and crustaceans, where all offspring of an individual female are either exclusively male or female. The mechanisms underlying the origin and evolution of this system are diverse and may include maternally controlled paternal genome elimination or Mendelian inherited maternal sex-determining factors (reproductive parasites).

== Evolution ==
=== Origin of sex chromosomes ===
Chromosomal sex determination may have evolved early in the history of eukaryotes; diverse forms exist in a wide range of animals. But in plants it has been suggested to have evolved recently. Sexual chromosome pairs could have arisen from an autosomal pair that, for various reasons, stopped recombination, allowing for their divergence. The rate at which recombination is suppressed, and therefore the rate of sex chromosome divergence, is very different across clades.

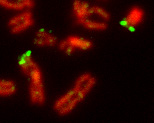
The ends of the XY chromosomes in a human cell in metaphase, highlighted here in green, are all that is left of the original autosomes that can still cross over with each other.

The accepted hypothesis of XY and ZW sex chromosome evolution in amniotes is that they evolved at the same time, in two different branches.

No genes are shared between the avian ZW and mammal XY chromosomes, and the chicken Z chromosome is similar to the human autosomal chromosome 9, rather than X or Y. This suggests not that the ZW and XY sex-determination systems share an origin, but that the sex chromosomes are derived from autosomal chromosomes of the common ancestor of birds and mammals. In the platypus, a monotreme, the X_{1} chromosome shares homology with therian mammals, while the X_{5} chromosome contains an avian sex-determination gene, further suggesting an evolutionary link.

However, there is some evidence to suggest that there could have been transitions between ZW and XY, such as in the southern platyfish Xiphophorus maculatus, which has both ZW and XY systems in the same population, despite the fact that ZW and XY have different gene locations. A recent theoretical model raises the possibility both of transitions between the XY/XX and ZZ/ZW system and environmental sex determination. The platypus' genes back up the possible evolutionary link between XY and ZW, because they have the DMRT1 gene possessed by birds on their X chromosomes. Regardless, XY and ZW follow a similar route. All sex chromosomes started out as an original autosome of an original amniote that relied upon temperature to determine the sex of offspring. After the mammals separated, the reptile branch further split into Lepidosauria and Archosauromorpha. These two groups both evolved the ZW system separately, as evidenced by the existence of different sex chromosomal locations. In mammals, one of the autosome pair, now Y, mutated its SOX3 gene into the SRY gene, causing that chromosome to designate sex. After this mutation, the SRY-containing chromosome inverted and was no longer completely homologous with its partner. The regions of the X and Y chromosomes that are still homologous to one another are known as the pseudoautosomal region. Once it inverted, the Y chromosome became unable to remedy deleterious mutations, and thus degenerated. The mechanism of degeneration is straightforwardly the lack of recombination during meiosis. It has been suggested that the Y chromosome will shrink further and stop functioning in ten million years: but the Y chromosome has been strictly conserved for many million years after its initial rapid gene loss.

Some vertebrates, such as the medaka fish, evolved sex chromosomes separately; their Y chromosome never inverted and can still swap genes with the X. These species' sex chromosomes are relatively primitive and unspecialized. Because the Y does not have male-specific genes and can interact with the X, XY and YY females can be formed as well as XX males. Non-inverted Y chromosomes with long histories are found in pythons and emus, each system being more than 120 million years old, suggesting that inversion is not inevitable. XO sex determination can evolve from XY sex determination more rapidly, in about 2 million years.

By analogy with geological strata, historical events in the evolution of sex chromosomes are called evolutionary strata. The human Y-chromosome has had about 5 strata, since the origin of X and Y chromosomes about 300 Mya from a pair of autosomes. Each stratum was formed when a pseudoautosomal region of the Y chromosome is inverted, stopping it from recombining with the X chromosome. Over time, each inverted region decays, possibly due to Muller's ratchet. Primate Y-chromosome evolution was rapid, with multiple inversions and shifts of the boundary of the pseudoautosomal region.

Among many species of salamanders, the two chromosomes are only distinguished by a pericentric inversion, so that the banding pattern of the X chromosome is the same as that of Y, but with a region near the centromere reversed. In some species, the X is pericentrically inverted and the Y is ancestral. In other species it is the opposite. The gene content of the X chromosome is almost identical among placental mammals. This is hypothesized to be because the X inactivation means that any change would cause serious disruption, thus subjecting it to strong purifying selection. Similarly, birds have highly conserved Z chromosomes.

=== Neo-sex chromosomes ===
Neo-sex chromosomes are currently existing sex chromosomes that formed when an autosome pair fused to the previously existing sex chromosome pair. Following this fusion, the autosomal portion undergoes recombination suppression, allowing them to differentiate. Such systems have been observed in insects, reptiles, birds, and mammals. They are useful to the study of the evolution of Y chromosome degeneration and dosage compensation.

=== Sex-chromosome turnover ===
The sex-chromosome turnover is an evolutionary phenomenon where sex chromosomes disappear or become autosomal, and autosomal chromosomes become sexual, repeatedly over evolutionary time. Some lineages have extensive turnover, but others don't. Generally, in an XY system, if the Y chromosome is degenerate, mostly different from the X chromosome, and has X dosage compensation, then turnover is unlikely. In particular, this applies to humans.

The ZW and XY systems can evolve into each other due to sexual conflict.

=== Homomorphism and the fountain of youth ===
Some sex chromosomes have remained homomorphic over millions of years, especially among lineages of fishes, amphibians, and nonavian reptiles. The fountain-of-youth model states that heteromorphy results from suppression of recombination, which in turn results from the male phenotype, not the sex chromosomes themselves. Therefore, if some XY sex-reversed females are fertile and adaptive under some circumstances, then the X and Y chromosomes would recombine in these individuals, preventing Y chromosome decay and maintaining long-term homomorphism.

Sex reversal denotes a situation where the phenotypic sex is different from the genotypic sex. While in humans, sex reversal (such as the XX male syndrome) are often infertile, sex-reversed individuals of some species are fertile under some conditions. For example, some XY-individuals in population of Chinook salmon in the Columbia River became fertile females, producing YY sons. Since Chinook salmons have homomorphic sex chromosomes, such YY sons are healthy. When YY males mate with XX females, all their progeny would be XY male if grown under normal conditions.

Support for the fountain-of-youth hypothesis is found in the common frog, where XX and XY males both suppress sex chromosome recombination, but XX and XY females both recombine at the same rate.

== See also ==
- Testis-determining factor
- Maternal influence on sex determination
- Sequential hermaphroditism
- Sex determination and differentiation (human)
