= XY sex-determination system =

Method of determining sex

Drosophila sex-chromosomes

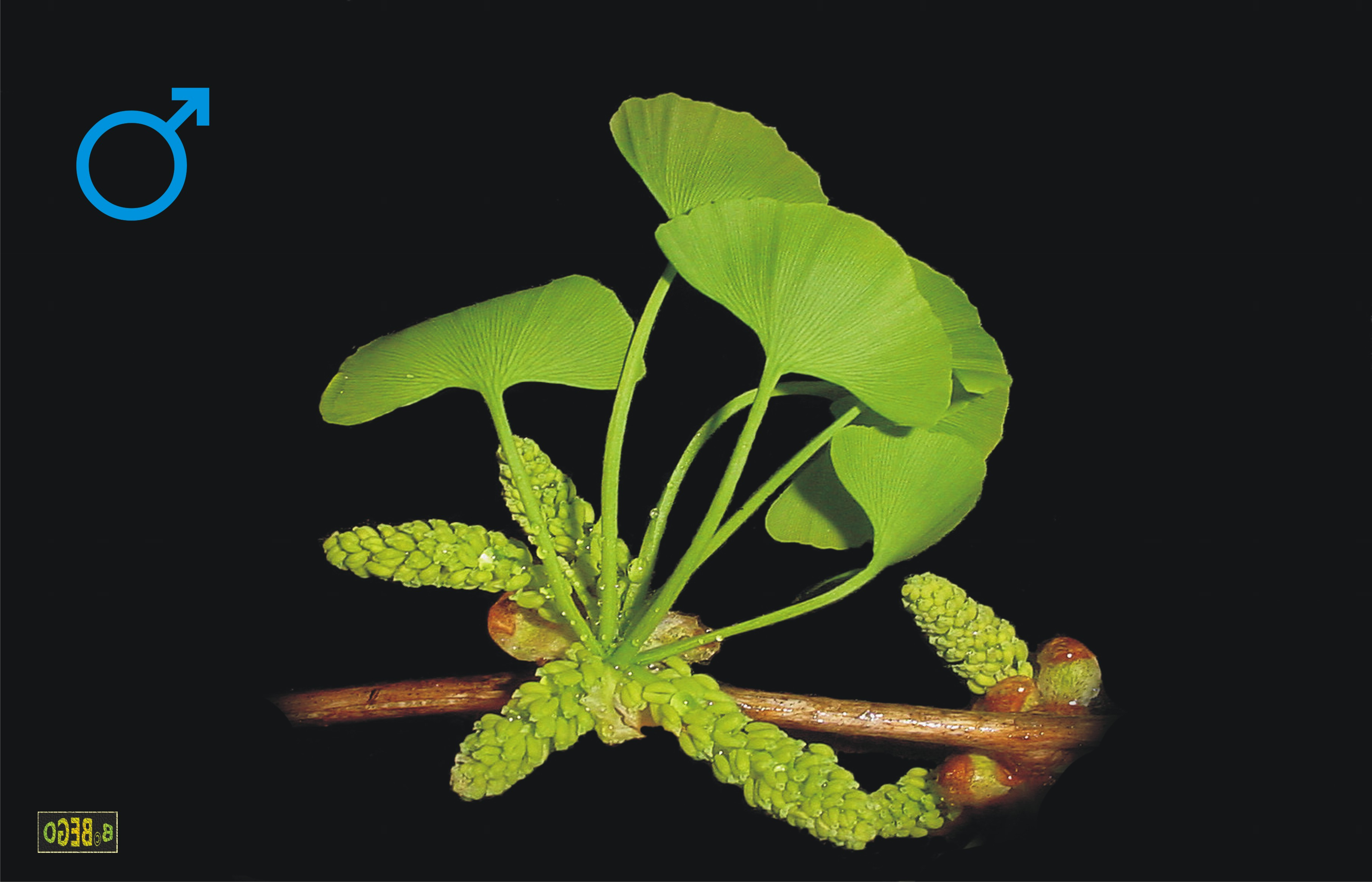
Pollen cones of a male Ginkgo biloba tree, a dioecious species

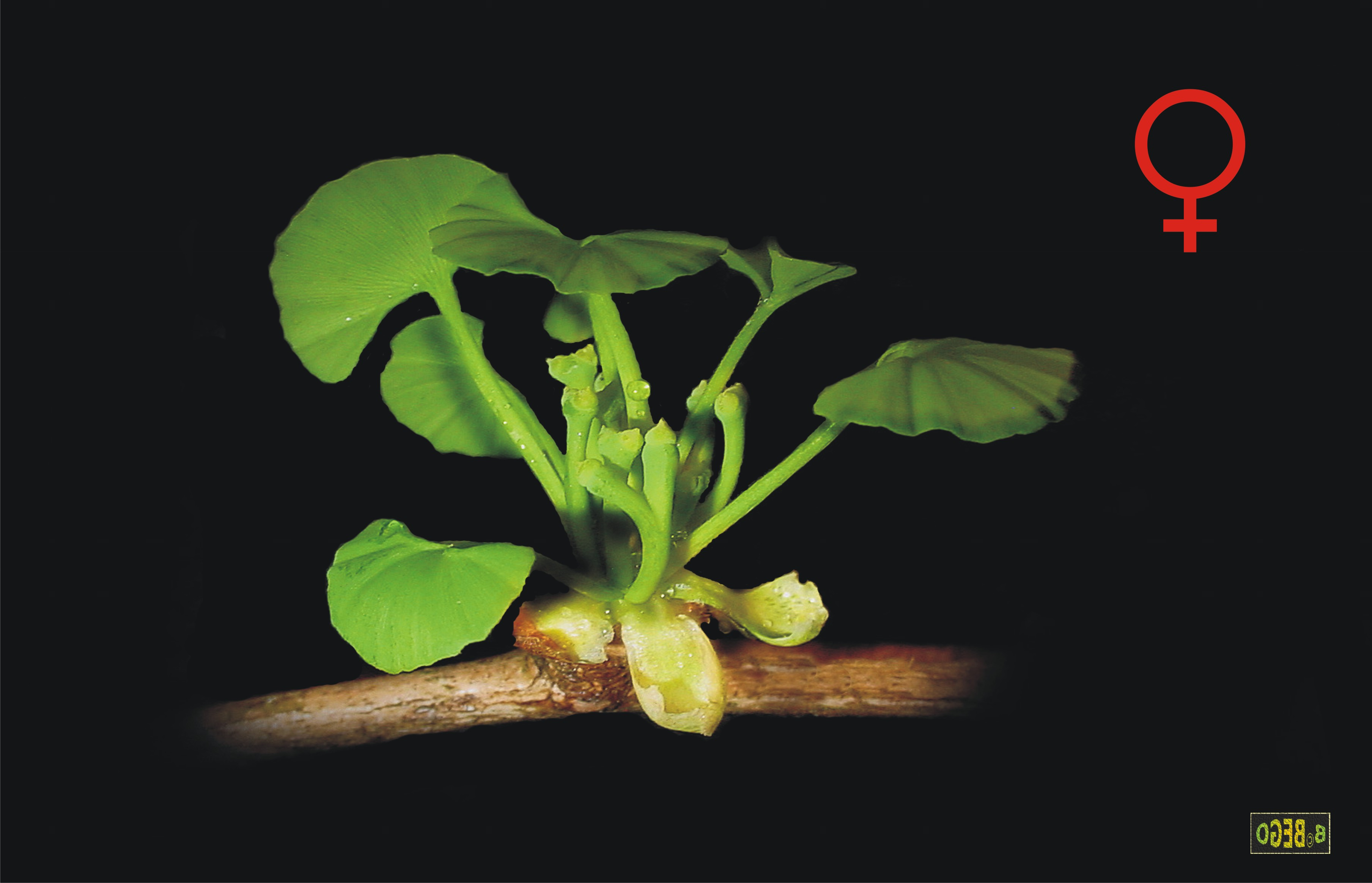
Ovules of a female Ginkgo biloba

The XY sex-determination system is a sex-determination system present in many mammals (including humans), some insects (Drosophila), some snakes, some fish (guppies), and some plants (Ginkgo tree).

In this system, the karyotypic sex of an individual is usually determined by a pair of sex chromosomes. Typically, karyotypic females have two of the same kind of sex chromosome (XX), and are called the homogametic sex. Karyotypic males typically have two different kinds of sex chromosomes (XY), and are called the heterogametic sex. In humans, the presence of the Y chromosome is responsible for triggering male phenotypic development; in the absence of the Y chromosome, the individual will usually develop phenotypicaly female. In most species with XY sex determination, an organism must have at least one X chromosome in order to survive.

The XY system contrasts in several ways with the ZW sex-determination system found in birds, some insects, many reptiles, and various other animals, in which the heterogametic sex is female. A temperature-dependent sex determination system is found in some reptiles and fish.

== Mechanisms ==
All animals have a genome made of DNA, which forms chromosomes during cell division. In humans, most mammals, and some other species, two of the chromosomes, called the X chromosome and Y chromosome, contain genes which code for sex. In these species, one or more genes are present on their Y chromosome that trigger development of the male phenotype. In this system, the X chromosome and the Y chromosome determine the karyotypic sex of offspring, while genes located on the Y chromosome trigger development of the male phenotype. Offspring usually have two sex chromosomes: an offspring with two X chromosomes (XX) will usually develop the female phenotype, and an offspring with an X and a Y chromosome (XY) will usually develop the male phenotype. Variations such as individuals with Swyer syndrome, that have an XY karyotype yet a female phenotype, and de la Chapelle Syndrome, that have XX chromosomes and a male phenotype, though less common, are exceptions. Additionally, there are several cases of phenotypic females with an XY karyotype (Swyer syndrome), who have successfully hosted a pregnancy.

=== Mammals ===
In most mammals, karyotypic sex is determined by presence of the Y chromosome. This makes individuals with XXY and XYY karyotypic males, and individuals with X and XXX karyotypic females.

In the 1930s, Alfred Jost determined that the presence of testosterone was required for Wolffian duct development in the male rabbit.

SRY is a sex-determining gene on the Y chromosome in the therians (placental mammals and marsupials). Non-human mammals use several genes on the Y chromosome.

Not all male-specific genes are located on the Y chromosome. The platypus, a monotreme, use five pairs of different XY chromosomes with six groups of male-linked genes, AMH being the master switch.

==== Humans ====
Human male XY chromosomes after G-banding

A single gene (SRY) present on the Y chromosome acts as a signal to trigger male phenotypic development. Presence of this gene starts off the process of virilization. This and other factors result in the sex differences in humans. In individuals with two X chromosomes, cells undergo X-inactivation, in which one of the two X chromosomes is inactivated. The inactivated X chromosome remains within a cell as a Barr body.

=== Other animals ===
Some species of turtles have convergently evolved XY sex determination systems, specifically those in Chelidae and Staurotypinae.

Other species (including most Drosophila species) use the presence of two X chromosomes to determine femaleness: one X chromosome gives putative maleness, but the presence of Y chromosome genes is required for normal male development. In the fruit fly individuals with XY are male and individuals with XX are female; however, individuals with XXY or XXX can also be female, and individuals with X can be males.

=== Plants ===
==== Angiosperms ====
While very few species of dioecious angiosperm have XY sex determination, making up less than 5% of all species, the sheer diversity of angiosperms means that the total number of species with XY sex determination is actually quite high, estimated to be at around 13,000 species. Molecular and evolutionary studies also show that XY sex determination has evolved independently many times in upwards of 175 unique families, with a recent study suggesting its evolution has independently occurred hundreds to thousands of times.

Many economically important crops are known to have an XY system of sex determination, including kiwifruit, asparagus, grapes and date palms.

==== Gymnosperms ====
In sharp contrast to angiosperms, approximately 65% of gymnosperms are dioecious. Some families which contain members that are known to have a XY system of sex determination include the cycad families Cycadaceae and Zamiaceae, Ginkgoaceae, Gnetaceae and Podocarpaceae.

=== Other systems ===
Whilst XY sex determination is the most familiar, since it is the system that humans use, there are a range of alternative systems found in nature. The inverse of the XY system (called ZW to distinguish it) is used in birds and many insects, in which it is the females that are heterogametic (ZW), while males are homogametic (ZZ).

Many insects of the order Hymenoptera instead have a haplo-diploid system, where the females are full diploids (with all chromosomes appearing in pairs) but males are haploid (having just one copy of all chromosomes). Some other insects have the X0 sex-determination system, where just the sex-determining chromosome varies in ploidy (XX in females but X in males), while all other chromosomes appear in pairs in both sexes.

== Influences ==
=== Genetic ===
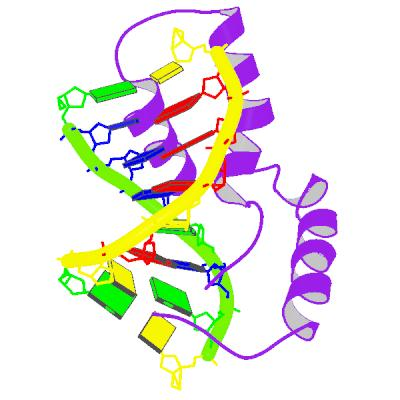
PBB Protein SRY image

In an interview for the Rediscovering Biology website, researcher Eric Vilain described how the paradigm changed since the discovery of the SRY gene:

For a long time we thought that SRY would activate a cascade of male genes. It turns out that the sex determination pathway is probably more complicated and SRY may in fact inhibit some anti-male genes.

The idea is instead of having a simplistic mechanism by which you have pro-male genes going all the way to make a male, in fact there is a solid balance between pro-male genes and anti-male genes and if there is a little too much of anti-male genes, there may be a female born and if there is a little too much of pro-male genes then there will be a male born.

We [are] entering this new era in molecular biology of sex determination where it's a more subtle dosage of genes, some pro-males, some pro-females, some anti-males, some anti-females that all interplay with each other rather than a simple linear pathway of genes going one after the other, which makes it very fascinating but very complicated to study.

In an interview by Scientific American in 2007, Vilian was asked: "It sounds as if you are describing a shift from the prevailing view that female development is a default molecular pathway to active pro-male and antimale pathways. Are there also pro-female and antifemale pathways?" He replied:

Modern sex determination started at the end of the 1940s—1947—when the French physiologist Alfred Jost said it's the testis that is determining sex. Having a testis determines maleness, not having a testis determines femaleness. The ovary is not sex-determining. It will not influence the development of the external genitalia. Now in 1959 when the karyotype of Klinefelter [a male who is XXY] and Turner [a female who has one X] syndromes was discovered, it became clear that in humans it was the presence or the absence of the Y chromosome that's sex determining. Because all Klinefelters that have a Y are male, whereas Turners, who have no Y, are females. So it's not a dosage or the number of X's, it's really the presence or absence of the Y. So if you combine those two paradigms, you end up having a molecular basis that's likely to be a factor, a gene, that's a testis-determining factor, and that's the sex-determining gene. So the field based on that is really oriented towards finding testis-determining factors. What we discovered, though, was not just pro-testis determining factors. There are a number of factors that are there, like WNT4, like DAX1, whose function is to counterbalance the male pathway.

In mammals, including humans, the SRY gene triggers the development of non-differentiated gonads into testes rather than ovaries. However, there are cases in which testes can develop in the absence of an SRY gene (see sex reversal). In these cases, the SOX9 gene, involved in the development of testes, can induce their development without the aid of SRY. In the absence of SRY and SOX9, no testes can develop and the path is clear for the development of ovaries. Even so, the absence of the SRY gene or the silencing of the SOX9 gene are not enough to trigger sexual differentiation of a fetus in the female direction. A recent finding suggests that ovary development and maintenance is an active process, regulated by the expression of a "pro-female" gene, FOXL2. In an interview for the TimesOnline edition, study co-author Robin Lovell-Badge explained the significance of the discovery:

We take it for granted that we maintain the sex we are born with, including whether we have testes or ovaries. But this work shows that the activity of a single gene, FOXL2, is all that prevents adult ovary cells turning into cells found in testes.

==== Implications ====
Looking into the genetic determinants of human sex can have wide-ranging consequences. Scientists have been studying different sex determination systems in fruit flies and animal models to attempt an understanding of how the genetics of sexual differentiation can influence biological processes like reproduction, ageing and disease.

=== Maternal ===
In humans and many other species of animals, the father determines the sex of the child. In the XY sex-determination system, the female-provided ovum contributes an X chromosome and the male-provided sperm contributes either an X chromosome or a Y chromosome, resulting in female (XX) or male (XY) offspring, respectively.

Hormone levels in the male parent affect the sex ratio of sperm in humans. Maternal influences also impact which sperm are more likely to achieve conception.

Human ova, like those of other mammals, are covered with a thick translucent layer called the zona pellucida, which the sperm must penetrate to fertilize the egg. Once viewed simply as an impediment to fertilization, recent research indicates the zona pellucida may instead function as a sophisticated biological security system that chemically controls the entry of the sperm into the egg and protects the fertilized egg from additional sperm.

Recent research indicates that human ova may produce a chemical which appears to attract sperm and influence their swimming motion. However, not all sperm are positively impacted; some appear to remain uninfluenced and some actually move away from the egg.

Maternal influences may also be possible that affect sex determination in such a way as to produce fraternal twins equally weighted between one male and one female.

The time at which insemination occurs during the estrus cycle has been found to affect the sex ratio of the offspring of humans, cattle, hamsters, and other mammals. Hormonal and pH conditions within the female reproductive tract vary with time, and this affects the sex ratio of the sperm that reach the egg.

Sex-specific mortality of embryos also occurs.

== History ==
=== Ancient ideas on sex determination ===
Aristotle believed incorrectly that the sex of an infant is determined by how much heat a man's sperm had during insemination. He wrote:

... the semen of the male differs from the corresponding secretion of the female in that it contains a principle within itself of such a kind as to set up movements also in the embryo and to concoct thoroughly the ultimate nourishment, whereas the secretion of the female contains material alone. If, then, the male element prevails it draws the female element into itself, but if it is prevailed over it changes into the opposite or is destroyed.

Aristotle claimed in error that the male principle was the driver behind sex determination, such that if the male principle was insufficiently expressed during reproduction, the fetus would develop as a female.

=== 20th century genetics ===
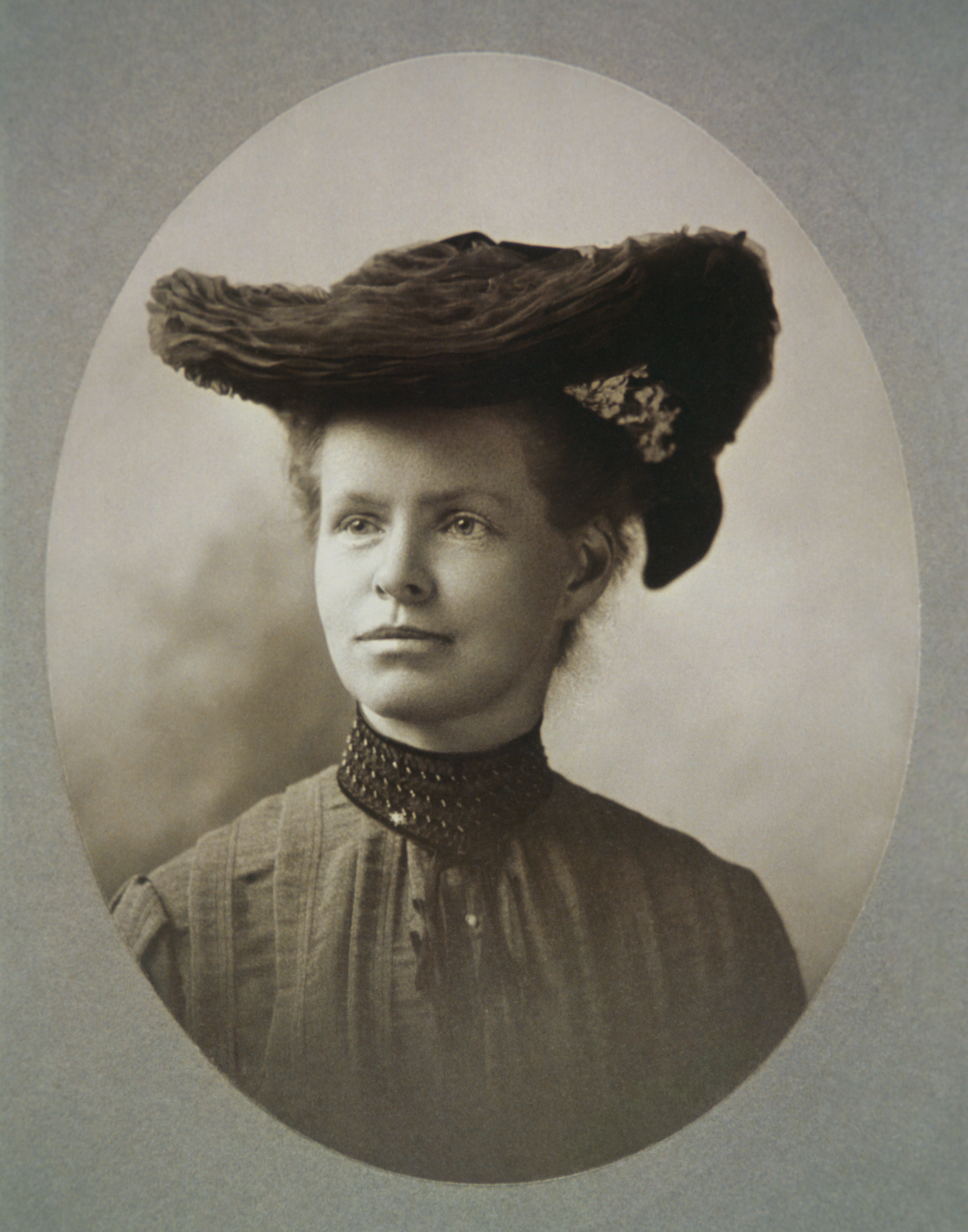
Nettie Stevens in 1904

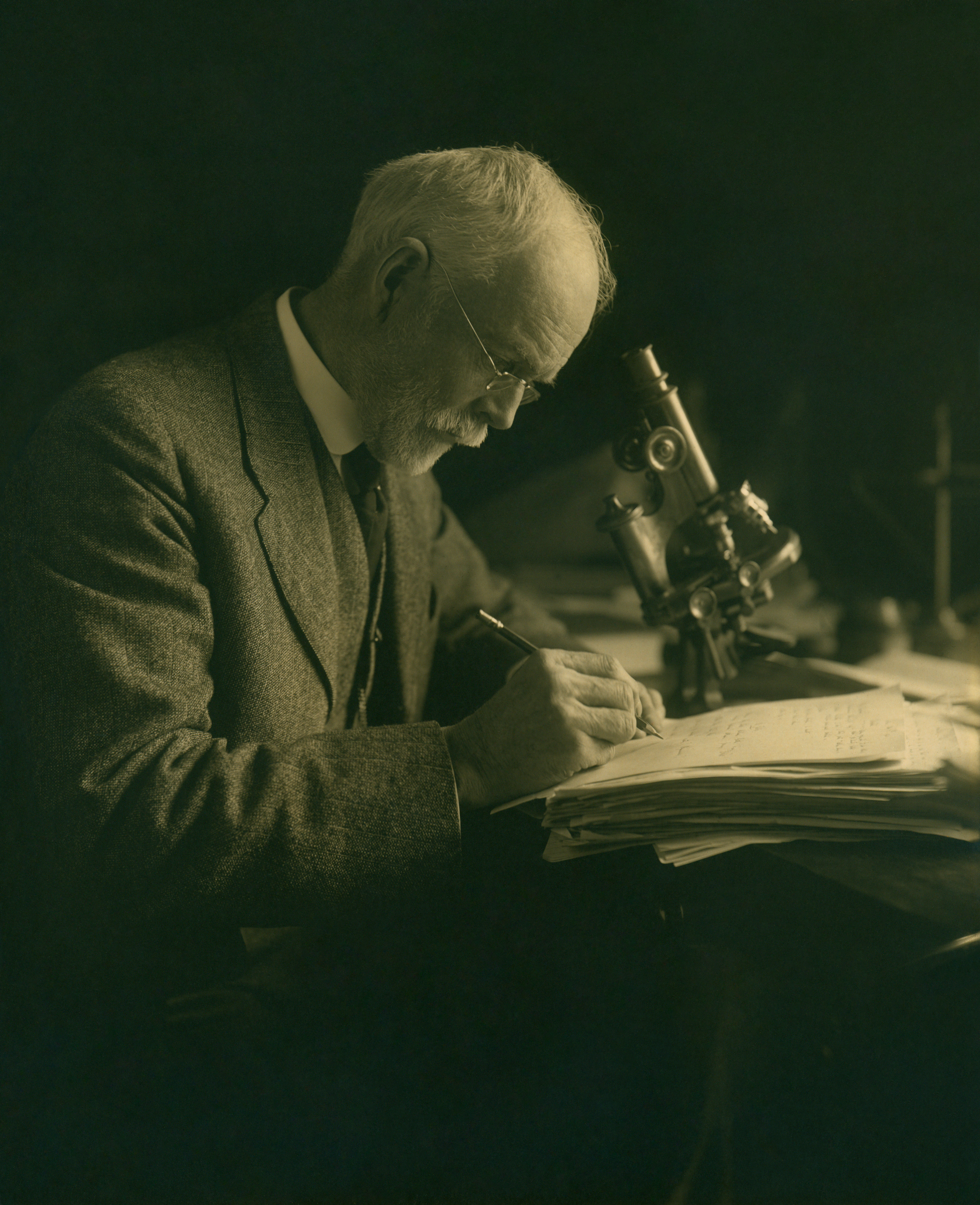
Edmund Beecher Wilson, before 1891

Nettie Stevens (working with beetles) and Edmund Beecher Wilson (working with hemiptera) are credited with independently discovering, in 1905, the chromosomal XY sex-determination system in insects: the fact that males have XY sex chromosomes and females have XX sex chromosomes. In the early 1920s, Theophilus Painter demonstrated that sex in humans (and other mammals) was also determined by the X and Y chromosomes, and the chromosomes that make this determination are carried by the spermatozoa.

The first clues to the existence of a factor that determines the development of testis in mammals came from experiments carried out by Alfred Jost, who castrated embryonic rabbits in utero and noticed that they all acquired a female phenotype.

In 1959, C. E. Ford and his team, in the wake of Jost's experiments, discovered that the Y chromosome was needed for a fetus to develop as male when they examined patients with Turner's syndrome, who grew up as phenotypic females, and found them to be X0 (hemizygous for X and no Y). At the same time, Jacob & Strong described a case of a patient with Klinefelter syndrome (XXY), which implicated the presence of a Y chromosome in development of maleness.

All these observations led to a consensus that a dominant gene that determines testis development (TDF) must exist on the human Y chromosome. The search for this testis-determining factor (TDF) led to Peter Goodfellow's team of scientists in 1990 to discover a region of the Y chromosome that is necessary for the male sex determination, which was named SRY (sex-determining region of the Y chromosome).

== See also ==
- Sexual differentiation (human)
- Secondary sex characteristic (human)
- Y-chromosomal Adam
- Sex Determination in Silene
- Z0 sex-determination system
