= Sexual differentiation =

Embryonic development of sex differences

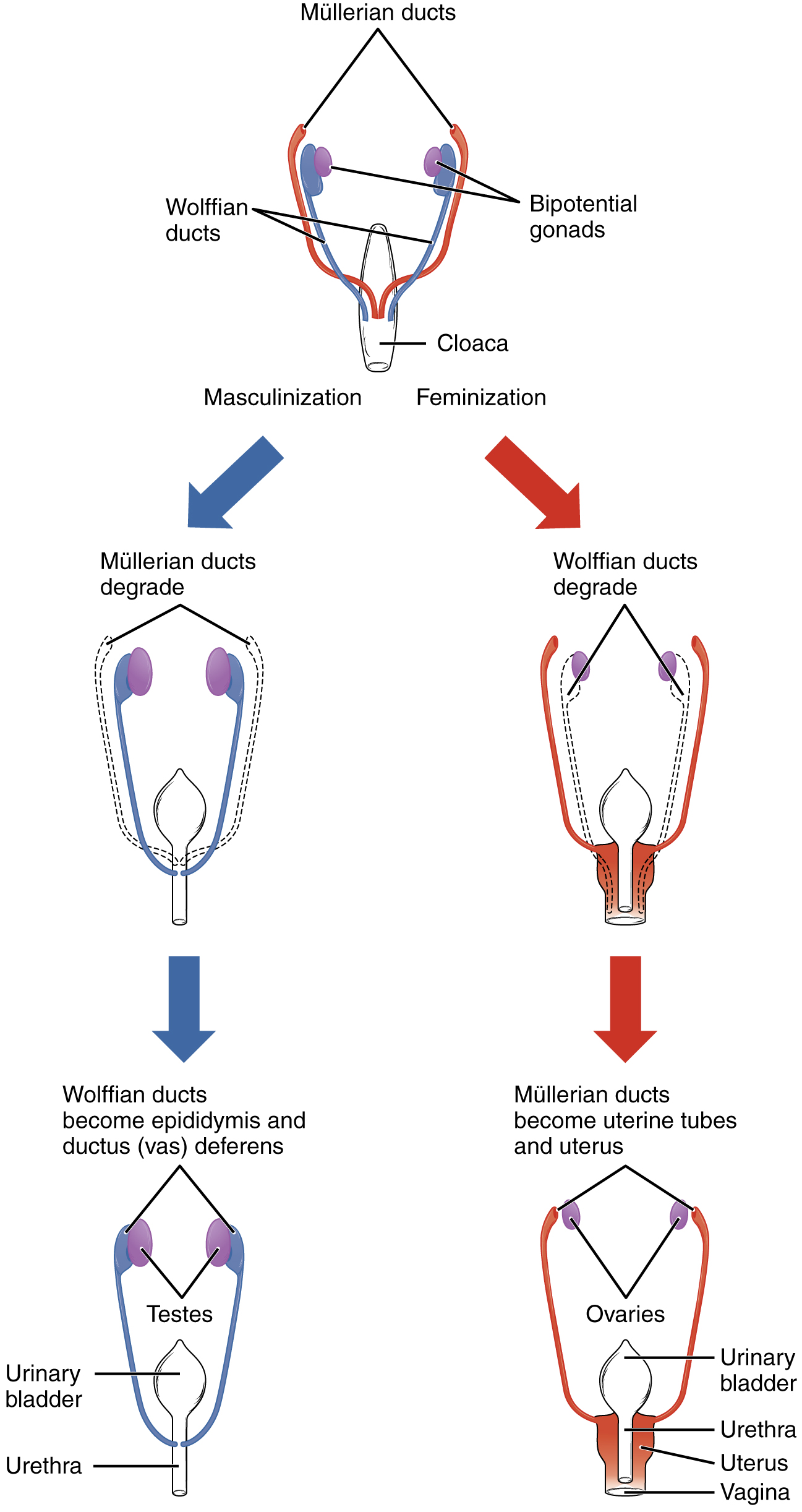
- Differentiation of the male and female reproductive systems does not occur until the fetal period of development.

Sexual differentiation is the process of development of the sex differences between males and females from an undifferentiated zygote. Sex differentiation is usually distinct from sex determination; sex determination is the designation of the development stage towards either male or female, while sex differentiation is the pathway towards the development of the phenotype.

In many species, testicular or ovarian differentiation begins with the appearance of Sertoli cells in males and granulosa cells in females.

As embryos develop into mature adults, sex differences develop at many levels, including chromosomes, gonads, hormones, and anatomy. Beginning with determining sex by genetic and/or environmental factors, humans and other organisms proceed towards different differentiation pathways as they grow and develop.

== Sex determination systems ==
Humans, many mammals, and some insects and other animals have an XY sex-determination system. Humans have 46 chromosomes, including two sex chromosomes, XX in females and XY in males. The Y chromosome must carry at least one essential gene which determines testicular formation (originally termed TDF). In transgenic XX mice (and some human XX males), the sex-determining region Y protein alone is sufficient to induce male differentiation.

Other chromosomal systems exist in different taxa, such as the ZW sex-determination system in birds and the XO system in insects.

Environmental sex determination refers to the determination (and then differentiation) of sex via non-genetic cues like social factors, temperature, and available nutrients. In some species, such as clownfish (known to be universally hermaphroditic), sex differentiation can occur more than once as a response to different environmental cues, offering an example of how sex differentiation does not always follow a linear path.

There have been multiple transitions between environmental and genetic sex determination systems in reptiles over time, and recent studies have shown that temperature can sometimes override sex determination via chromosomes.

== Humans ==
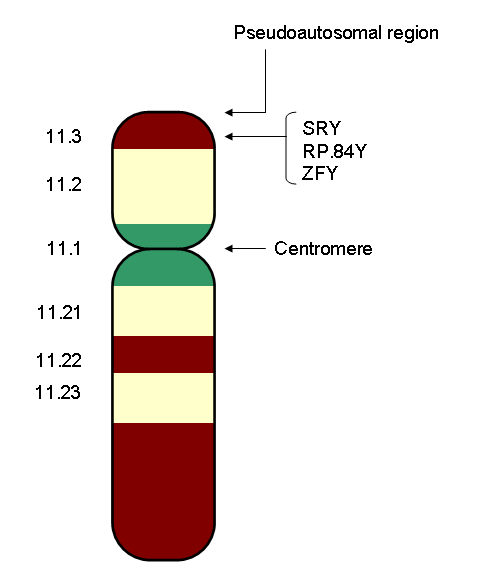
The Human Y Chromosome shows the SRY gene which codes for a protein regulating sexual differentiation.

The early stages of human differentiation appear to be quite similar to the same biological processes in other mammals—and the interaction of genes, hormones and body structures is fairly well understood. In the first weeks of gestation, a fetus is anatomically indistinguishable as male or female and lacks the production of any particular sex hormones. Only a karyotype distinguishes males from females. Specific genes induce gonadal differences, which produce hormonal differences, which cause anatomic differences, leading to psychological and behavioral differences, some of which are innate and some induced by the social environment.

Various processes are involved in the development of sex differences in humans. Sexual differentiation in humans includes the development of different genitalia—and the internal genital tracts, breasts, and body hair—and plays a role in gender identification.

The development of sexual differences begins with the XY sex-determination system that is present in humans, and complex mechanisms are responsible for the development of the phenotypic differences between male and female humans from an undifferentiated zygote. Atypical sexual development, and ambiguous genitalia, can be a result of genetic and hormonal factors.

The differentiation of other parts of the body than the sex organ creates secondary sex characteristics. Sexual dimorphism of skeletal structure develops during childhood and becomes more pronounced in adolescence.

== Other animals ==
The first genes involved in the cascade of differentiation can differ between taxa and even between closely related species. For example: in zebrafish, the first known gene to induce male differentiation is the amh gene. In tilapia, it is tDmrt1, and in southern catfish, it is foxl2.

In fish, because modes of reproduction range from gonochorism (distinct sexes) to self-fertilizing hermaphroditism (where one organism has functioning gonadal features of multiple sexes), sexual differentiation is complex. Two major pathways in gonochores exist: one with a nonfunctional, undifferentiated phase leading to delayed differentiation (secondary), and one without (primary), where differences between the sexes can be noted before hatching. Secondary gonochorists remain in the bipotential phase until a biotic or abiotic cue directs development down one pathway. Primary gonochorism, without an intersex phase, follows classical pathways of genetic sex determination but can still be later influenced by the environment. Differentiation pathways progress, and secondary sex characteristics such as anal fin bifurcation and ornamentation typically arise at puberty.

In birds, research on Gallus gallus domesticus has shown that determination of sex is likely cell-autonomous, i.e., that sex is determined in each somatic cell independently of, or in conjunction with, the hormone signaling that occurs in other species. Studies on gynandromorph chickens showed that mosaicism could not be explained by hormones alone, pointing to direct genetic factors, possibly one or a few Z-specific genes such as double-sex or DMRT1.

== Flexibility ==
The most intensively studied species, such as fruit flies, nematodes, and mice, reveal that evolutionarily, sex determination/differentiation systems are not wholly conserved and have evolved over time. Beyond the presence or absence of chromosomes or social/environmental factors, sexual differentiation can be regulated in part by complex systems like the ratio of genes on X chromosomes and autosomes, protein production and transcription, and specific mRNA splicing.

Differentiation pathways can be altered at many stages of the process. Sex reversal, where the development of a sexual phenotype is redirected during embryonic development, happens in the initiation phase of gonadal sex differentiation. Even in species where there is a well-documented master regulator gene, its effects can be overridden by a downstream gene.

Furthermore, hermaphrodites serve as examples of the flexibility of sexual differentiation systems. Sequential hermaphrodites are organisms that possess reproductive capabilities of one sex, and then that sex changes. Differentiated gonadal tissue of the organism's former sex degenerates, and new sex gonadal tissue grows and differentiates. Organisms that have the physiological capability to reproduce as a male and as a female at the same time are known as simultaneous hermaphrodites. Some simultaneous hermaphroditic organisms, like certain species of goby, have distinctive male and female phases of reproduction and can flip back and forth, or "sex reverse", between the two.

=== Socially-determined ===
In some species, such as sequentially hermaphroditic clownfish, changes in social environment can lead to sexual differentiation or sex reversal, i.e. differentiation in the opposite direction. In clownfish, females are larger than males. In social groups, there is typically one large female, multiple smaller males, and undifferentiated juveniles. If the female is removed from the group, the largest male changes sex, i.e. the former gonad tissue degenerates and new gonad tissue grows. Furthermore, the pathway of differentiation is activated in the largest juvenile, which becomes male.

=== Alternative morphs ===
Sexual differentiation in a species does not have to produce one recognizable female and one recognizable male type. In some species alternative morphs, or morphotypes, within one sex exist, such as flanged (larger than females, with large flap-like cheek-pads) and unflanged (about the same size as females, with no cheek-pads) male orangutans, and sometimes differences between male morphs can be more noticeable than differences between a male and a female within such species. Furthermore, sexual selection can be involved in the development of different types of males with alternative reproductive strategies, such as sneaker and territorial males in dung beetles or harem males and pair-bonding males in the Nigerian cichlid fish P. pulcher. Sometimes alternative morphs are produced by genetic differences, and in other cases, the environment can be involved, demonstrating some degree of phenotypic plasticity.

== Brain differentiation ==
In many animals, differences in the exposure of a fetal brain to sex hormones are correlated with significant differences in brain structure and function, which correlate with adult reproductive behavior. The causes of differences between the sexes are only understood in some species. Fetal sex differences in human brains coupled with early differences in experience may be responsible for sex differences observed in children between 4 years old and adolescence.

Many individual studies in humans and other primates have found statistically significant sex differences in specific brain structures; however, some studies have found no sex differences, and some meta-analyses have called into question the over-generalization that women's and men's brains function differently. Males and females statistically differ in some aspects of their brains, still there are areas of the brain which appear not to be sexually differentiated at all. Some scholars describe human brain variation not as two distinct categories, and not even a maleness-femaleness continuum, but as mosaics.

In birds, hypotheses of male-female brain sex differences have been challenged by recent findings that differences between groups can be at least partially explained by the individual's dominance rank. Furthermore, the behavioral causes of brain sex differences have been enumerated in studies of sex differences between different mating systems. For example, males of a polygynous vole species with intrasexual male competition have better spatial learning and memory than the females of their species, but also better spatial learning and memory than all sexes of other closely related species that are monogamous; thus the brain differences commonly seen as "sex differences" have been instead linked to competition. Sexual selection does play a role in some species, though, as males who display more song behaviors are selected for by females—so some sex differences in bird song brain regions seem to have been evolutionarily selected for over time.
