= XO sex-determination system =

Biological system that determines the sex of offspring

Heredity of sex chromosomes in XO sex determination

The XO sex-determination system (sometimes referred to as X0 sex-determination system) is a system that some species of insects, arachnids, and mammals (not including humans) use to determine the sex of offspring. In this system, there is only one sex chromosome, referred to as X. Males only have one X chromosome (XO), while females have two (XX). The letter O (sometimes a zero) signifies the lack of a Y chromosome. Maternal gametes always contain an X chromosome, so the sex of the animals' offspring depends on whether a sex chromosome is present in the male gamete. Its sperm normally contains either one X chromosome or no sex chromosomes at all.

This system determines the sex of offspring among:

- Most arachnids with the exception of mites where a small majority are haplodiploid
- Almost all apterygote and Paleopteran insects (e.g., dragonflies, silverfish)
- Most exopterygote insects (e.g., grasshoppers, crickets, cockroaches)
- Some nematodes, crustaceans, gastropod molluscs, and bony fish, notably in the genus Ancistrus
- Several mammals, including:
  - A few species of bat, including the hammer-headed bat, Buettikofer's epauletted fruit bat, Franquet's epauletted fruit bat, Peters's epauletted fruit bat, and Gambian epauletted fruit bat
  - The Ryukyu spiny rat and Tokunoshima spiny rat

In a variant of this system, most individuals have two sex chromosomes (XX) and are hermaphroditic, producing both eggs and sperm with which they can fertilize themselves, while rare individuals are male and have only one sex chromosome (XO). The model organism Caenorhabditis elegans—a nematode frequently used in biological research—is one such organism.

Most spiders have a variation of the XO system in which males have two different X chromosomes (X_{1}X_{2}O), while females have a pair of X_{1} chromosomes and a pair of X_{2} chromosomes (X_{1}X_{1}X_{2}X_{2}). Some spiders have more complex systems involving as many as 13 different X chromosomes.

Some Drosophila species have XO males.

In humans the XO designation attaches to individuals with Turner syndrome.

== Evolution ==
A species can shift from XY to XO sex determination in fewer than 2 million years. It typically evolves due to Y-chromosome degeneration. As the Y-chromosome is not paired (though see pseudoautosomal region), it is susceptible to decay by Muller's ratchet.

Similarly, the W chromosome in a ZW sex-determination system is susceptible to decay, resulting in a ZZ/ZO system.

== Parthenogenesis ==
Parthenogenesis with XO sex-determination can occur by different mechanisms to produce either male or female offspring.

== See also ==
- Sex-determination system
- Sexual differentiation
- Haplodiploid sex-determination system
- XY sex-determination system
- ZO sex-determination system
- ZW sex-determination system
- Temperature-dependent sex determination
- X chromosome
- Y chromosome
