= Pseudo-arrhenotoky =

Biological phenomenon

Pseudo-arrhenotoky or paternal genome elimination is the phenomenon where males develop from fertilized eggs but the paternal genome is heterochromatinized or lost in the somatic cells and not passed on to their offspring.

This phenomenon occurs in certain mites, beetles and mealybugs and scale insects.

When the males have a diploid number of chromosomes they are termed parahaploids as the paternal genes are not expressed at all. The paternal chromosomes are inactivated by heterochromatization in all the cells at an early embryonic stage. The adult cells have one set of inactive H chromosomes and one set of euchromatin E chromosomes. These H chromosomes are eliminated from the sperm during or just before spermatogenesis. In a few other species all the cells in an adult are haploid due to elimination of the paternal chromosomes at an early developmental stage. This variant is called the diaspidid system after the scale insect clade (Diaspididae) where it was discovered. It is also found in some mites.

Genetically this system is equivalent both to haplodiploid arrhenotoky where the males are haploid and develop from unfertilized eggs and to certain cases of diploid arrhenotoky where the males get a diploid chromosome set from their mother but inactivate and fail to pass on half of them. Pseudo-arrhenotoky causes a female's genetic contribution to her son's children to double. This intragenomic conflict between maternal and paternal genes can lead to pseudo-arrhenotoky arising. Under conditions where the optimal sex ratio is biased, pseudo-arrhenotoky allows the female a precise control of the ratio of sons to daughters. Pseudo arrhenotoky has evolved into haplodiploidy (haploid arrhenotoky) in some species possibly due to sustained intragenomic conflict or due to pressure to colonize habitats by a single unmated female. Relative to arrhenotoky, pseudo-arrhenotoky may have the advantage of allowing DNA damage to be repaired.

== See also ==
- Gynogenesis
- Thelytoky
- Hybridogenesis
