= ZW sex-determination system =

Chromosomal system

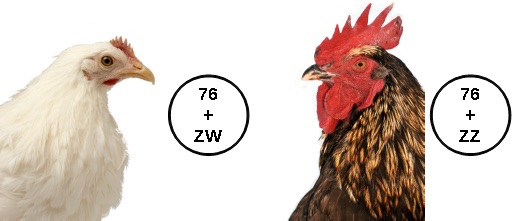
ZW sex determination in birds (as exemplified with chickens)

The ZW sex-determination system is a chromosomal system that determines the sex of offspring in birds, some fish and crustaceans such as the giant river prawn, some insects (including butterflies and moths), the Schistosomatidae family of flatworms, and some reptiles, e.g. majority of snakes, lacertid lizards and monitors, including Komodo dragons. It is also present in some plants, where it has evolved independently on many occasions, characterizing at least 22% of plants with documented sex chromosomes. The letters Z and W are used to distinguish this system from the XY sex-determination system. In the ZW system, females have a pair of dissimilar ZW chromosomes, and males have two similar ZZ chromosomes.

In contrast to the XY sex-determination system and the X0 sex-determination system, where the sperm determines the sex, in the ZW system, the ovum determines the sex of the offspring. Males are the homogametic sex (ZZ), while females are the heterogametic sex (ZW). The Z chromosome is larger and has more genes, similarly to the X chromosome in the XY system.

== Significance of the ZW and XY systems ==
No genes are shared between the avian ZW and mammalian XY chromosomes, and, from a comparison between chicken and human, the Z chromosome appears similar to the autosomal chromosome 9 in humans. It has been proposed that the ZW and XY Sex-determination systems do not share an origin but that the sex chromosomes are derived from autosomal chromosomes of the common ancestor. These autosomes are thought to have evolved sex-determining loci that eventually developed into the respective sex chromosomes once the recombination between the chromosomes (X and Y or Z and W) was suppressed.

The platypus, a monotreme mammal, has a system of five pairs of XY chromosomes. They form a multiple chain due to homologous regions in male meiosis and finally segregates into XXXXX-sperm and YYYYY-sperm. The bird Z-like pair shows up on opposite ends of the chain. Areas homologous to the bird Z chromosome are scattered throughout X3 and X5. Although the sex-determination system is not necessarily linked to that of birds and definitely not to that of therian mammals, the similarity at least allowed for the conclusion that mammals evolved sex chromosomes twice. The previous report that platypus has X chromosomes similar to that of therian mammals is now considered a mistake.

Bird and snake ZW are unrelated, having evolved from different autosomes. However, the bird-like chromosomes of platypus may indicate that ancestors of snakes had a bird-like ZW system.

== Across species ==
=== In birds ===
In 2007, a time when there had not been extensive research on other organisms with the ZW sex-determination system, researchers announced that chickens' and zebra finches' sex chromosomes do not exhibit any type of chromosome-wide dosage compensation, and instead seem to dosage compensate on a gene-by-gene basis. Specific locations on the chicken Z chromosome, such as the MHM region, are thought to exhibit regional dosage compensation, though researchers have argued that this region does not actually constitute local dosage compensation. Further research expanded the list of birds that do not exhibit any type of chromosome-wide dosage compensation to crows and ratites, thus implying that all avian chromosomes lack chromosome-wide dosage compensation. Both transcriptional and translational gene-specific dosage compensation have been observed in avian sex chromosomes. In addition, the involvement of sex-biased miRNAs was proposed to compensate for the presence of two Z-chromosomes in male birds.

It is unknown whether it might be that the presence of the W chromosome induces female features, or whether instead it is the duplication of the Z chromosome that induces male ones; unlike mammals, no birds with a double W chromosome (ZWW) or a single Z (Z0) have been satisfactorily documented. However, it is known that the removal or damage to the ovaries of female birds can lead to the development of male plumage, suggesting that female hormones repress the expression of male characteristics in birds. It appears possible that either condition could cause embryonic death, or that both chromosomes could be responsible for sex selection. One possible gene that could determine sex in birds is the DMRT1 gene. Studies have shown that two copies of the gene are necessary for male sex determination. There appears to be a lack of female-specific genes on the W chromosome, unlike the therian Y chromosome which includes several male-specific genes. The degeneration of the avian W from an ancestral Z-like chromosome, similar to Muller's ratchet for the Y, is probably driven by selection for male-advantageous genes on the Z.

The ZW sex-determination system makes it possible to create sex-link chickens in which color at hatching is differentiated by sex, thus making chick-sexing an easier process.

=== In snakes ===
Snakes' W chromosomes show different levels of decay compared to their Z chromosomes. This allows for tracking the shrinking of W chromosomes (analogous to the shrinking of Y chromosomes) by comparing across species. Mapping of specific genes reveals that the snake system is different from the bird system. It is not yet known which gene is the sex-determining one in snakes. One thing that stood out was that pythons show little signs of "W-shrinking".

Boa and Python families are now known to probably have an XY sex-determination system. Interest in looking into this came from female family members capable of parthenogenesis, or producing offspring without mating. In 2010 a female Boa constrictor that produced 22 female offspring in this manner was found in the wild. By then it was presumed that such a pattern was produced by WW chromosomes. Python bivittatus and Boa imperator, similarly only produce female offspring; their genomes share male-specific single nucleotide polymorphisms identifiable by restriction enzyme digestion. Their chromosomal origins, however, differ: Python's XY are similar to other snakes' ZW, while Boa XY maps to microchromosomes in other snakes. The female-only pattern is in contrast to the ZW Colubroidean parthenogens, which always produce male (ZZ) offspring.

=== In moths and butterflies ===
In Lepidoptera (moths and butterflies), females can have Z, ZZW, or ZZWW.

=== In schistosomes ===
The family Schistosomatidae, commonly called blood flukes, are small parasitic flatworms dwelling in the blood vessels of the bladder, liver, intestines and other organs of birds and mammals. They are the only sexually heteromorphic family among the trematode class, and depend on remaining biochemically paired in copula to complete their life cycle. The heterogametic sex chromosomes in females of nine species of schistosomes were first described by geneticist Margaret Menzel and parasitologist Robert B. Short of Florida State University in 1960. The difference in the sex chromosomes was noted during the pachytene stage of meiotic prophase.

=== In turtles ===
Trionychidae turtles possess a ZZ-ZW sex determinate system, which originated sometime between the beginning of the Jurassic and the Early Cretaceous.

=== In plants ===
Among the approximately 5% of plant species that have separate male and female individuals (dioecious), several are known to have a ZW system of sex determination. These include pistachio, several species of strawberry such as Fragaria virginiana and Fragaria chiloensis, and several species of willow including Salix viminalis and Salix purpurea.

== See also ==
- Sexual differentiation
