= Male =

Sex of an organism which produces sperm

The symbol of the Roman god Mars (god of war) is often used to represent the male sex. It also stands for the planet Mars and is the alchemical symbol for iron.

Male (symbol: ♂) is the sex of an organism that produces, or is organized to produce, the gamete (sex cell) known as sperm, which fuses with the larger female gamete, or ovum, in the process of fertilisation. A male organism cannot reproduce sexually without access to at least one ovum from a female, but some organisms can reproduce both sexually and asexually. Most male mammals, including male humans, have a Y chromosome, which codes for the production of larger amounts of testosterone to develop male reproductive organs.

In humans, the word male can also be used to refer to gender, in the social sense of gender role or gender identity.

== Overview ==
The existence of separate sexes has evolved independently at different times and in different lineages, an example of convergent evolution. The repeated pattern is sexual reproduction in isogamous species with two or more mating types with gametes of identical form and behavior (but different at the molecular level) to anisogamous species with gametes of male and female types to oogamous species in which the female gamete is very much larger than the male and has no ability to move. There is a good argument that this pattern was driven by the physical constraints on the mechanisms by which two gametes get together as required for sexual reproduction.. But in some species males can reproduce by themselves asexually, for example via androgenesis.

Accordingly, sex is defined across species by the type of gametes produced (i.e.: spermatozoa vs. ova) and differences between males and females in one lineage are not always predictive of differences in another.

Male/female dimorphism between organisms or reproductive organs of different sexes is not limited to animals; male gametes are produced by chytrids, diatoms and land plants, among others. In land plants, female and male designate not only the female and male gamete-producing organisms and structures but also the structures of the sporophytes that give rise to male and female plants.

== Evolution ==
The evolution of anisogamy led to the evolution of male and female function. Before the evolution of anisogamy, mating types in a species were isogamous: the same size and both could move, catalogued only as "+" or "-" types. In anisogamy, the mating type is called a gamete. The male gamete is smaller than the female gamete, and usually mobile. Anisogamy remains poorly understood, as there is no fossil record of its emergence. Numerous theories exist as to why anisogamy emerged. Many share a common thread, in that larger female gametes are more likely to survive, and that smaller male gametes are more likely to find other gametes because they can travel faster. Current models often fail to account for why isogamy remains in a few species. Anisogamy appears to have evolved multiple times from isogamy; for example, female Volvocales (a type of green algae) evolved from the plus mating type. Although sexual evolution emerged at least 1.2 billion years ago, the lack of anisogamous fossil records make it hard to pinpoint when males evolved. One theory suggests male evolved from the dominant mating type (called mating type minus).

== Symbol, etymology, and usage ==
=== Symbol ===
A common symbol used to represent the male sex is the Mars symbol ♂, a circle with an arrow pointing northeast. The Unicode code-point is:

U+2642 ♂ MALE SIGN (&male;)

The symbol is identical to the planetary symbol of Mars. It was first used to denote sex by Carl Linnaeus in 1751. The symbol is sometimes seen as a stylized representation of the shield and spear of the Roman god Mars. According to William T. Stearn, however, this derivation is "fanciful" and all the historical evidence favours "the conclusion of the French classical scholar Claude de Saumaise (Salmasius, 1588–1683)" that it is derived from θρ, the contraction of a Greek name for the planet Mars, which is Thouros.

=== Etymology ===
Borrowed from Old French masle, from Latin masculus ("masculine, male, worthy of a man"), diminutive of mās ("male person or animal, male").

=== Usage ===
In humans, the word male can be used in the context of gender, such as for gender role or gender identity of a man or boy. For example, according to Merriam-Webster, "male" can refer to "having a gender identity that is the opposite of female". According to the Cambridge Dictionary, "male" can mean "belonging or relating to men".

Male can also refer to a shape of connectors.

== Sex determination ==
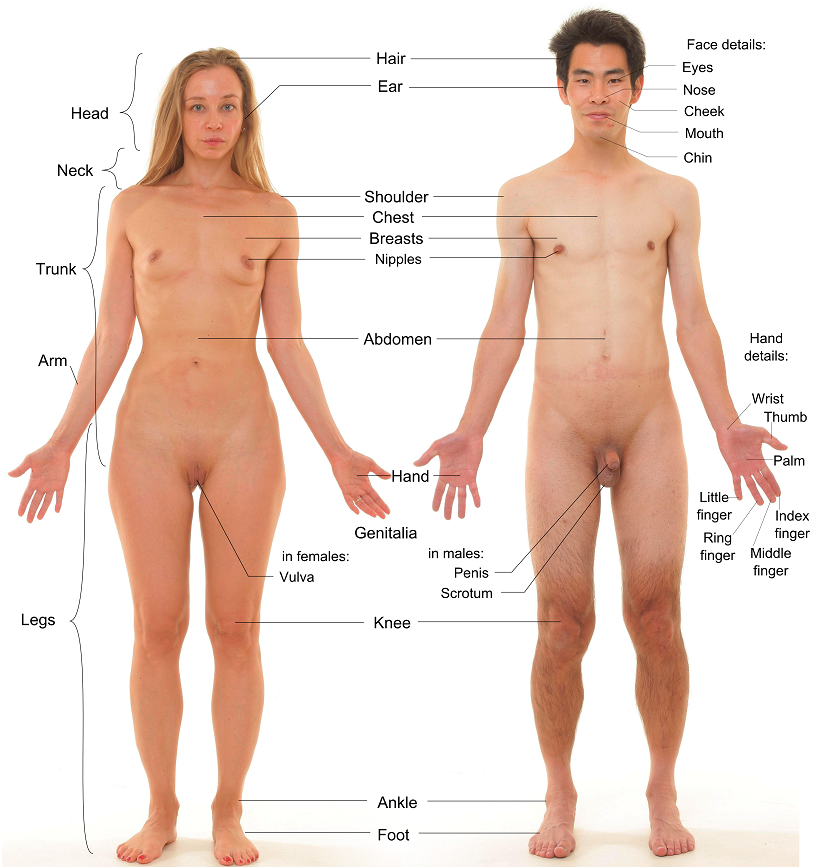
Photograph of an adult male human, with an adult female for comparison. Both models have partially shaved body hair; e.g. clean-shaven pubic regions.

The sex of a particular organism may be determined by a number of factors. These may be genetic or environmental, or may naturally change during the course of an organism's life. Although most species have only two sexes (either male or female), hermaphroditic animals, such as worms, have both male and female reproductive organs. Species that are divided into females and males are classified as gonochoric in animals, as dioecious in seed plants and as dioicous in cryptogams. Males can coexist with hermaphrodites, a sexual system called androdioecy. They can also coexist with females and hermaphrodites, a sexual system called trioecy.

Not all species share a common sex-determination system. In most animals, including humans, sex is determined genetically; however, species such as Cymothoa exigua change sex depending on the number of females present in the vicinity.

=== Genetic determination ===
Most mammals, including humans, are genetically determined as such by the XY sex-determination system where males have XY (as opposed to XX in females) sex chromosomes. It is also possible in a variety of species, including humans, to be XX male or have other karyotypes. During reproduction, a male can give either an X sperm or a Y sperm, while a female can only give an X egg. A Y sperm and an X egg produce a male, while an X sperm and an X egg produce a female.

The part of the Y-chromosome which is responsible for maleness is the sex-determining region of the Y-chromosome, the SRY. The SRY activates Sox9, which forms feedforward loops with FGF9 and PGD_{2} in the gonads, allowing the levels of these genes to stay high enough in order to cause male development; for example, Fgf9 is responsible for development of the spermatic cords and the multiplication of Sertoli cells, both of which are crucial to male sexual development.

The ZW sex-determination system, where males have ZZ (as opposed to ZW in females) sex chromosomes, may be found in birds and some insects (mostly butterflies and moths) and other organisms. Members of the insect order Hymenoptera, such as ants and bees, are often determined by haplodiploidy, where most males are haploid and females and some sterile males are diploid. However, fertile diploid males may still appear in some species, such as Cataglyphis cursor.

=== Environmental determination ===
In some species of reptiles, such as alligators, sex is determined by the temperature at which the egg is incubated. Other species, such as some snails, practice sex change: adults start out male, then become female. In tropical clown fish, the dominant individual in a group becomes female while the other ones are male.

== Secondary sex characteristics ==
Male animals have evolved to use secondary sex characteristics as a way of displaying traits that signify their fitness. Sexual selection is believed to be the driving force behind the development of these characteristics. Differences in physical size and the ability to fulfill the requirements of sexual selection have contributed significantly to the outcome of secondary sex characteristics in each species.

In many species, males differ from females in more ways than just the production of sperm. For example, in some insects and fish, the male is smaller than the female. In seed plants, the sporophyte sex organ of a single organism includes both the male and female parts.

In mammals, including humans, males are typically larger than females. This is often attributed to the need for male mammals to be physically stronger and more competitive in order to win mating opportunities. In humans specifically, males have more body hair and muscle mass than females.

Birds often exhibit colorful plumage that attracts females. This is true for many species of birds where the male displays more vibrant colors than the female, making them more noticeable to potential mates. These characteristics have evolved over time as a result of sexual selection, as males who exhibited these traits were more successful in attracting mates and passing on their genes.

== See also ==
- Boy
- Man
- Masculinity
- Lord
- Gentleman
