= R-spondin 1 =

Protein found in humans

RSPO1

Identifiers
- Aliases: RSPO1, CRISTIN3, RSPO, R-spondin 1
- External IDs: OMIM: 609595; MGI: 2183426; GeneCards: RSPO1
Available structures
PDB	Ortholog search: PDBe RCSB
PDB	List of PDB id codes 4BSO, 4BSP, 4BSR, 4BSS, 4BST, 4BSU, 4CDK, 4KNG, 4KT1, 4LI2, 4QXF

Gene location (Human)
Chr.	Chromosome 1 (human)
Band	1p34.3	Start	37,611,350 bp
Band	1p34.3	End	37,634,892 bp

Gene location (Mouse)
Chr.	Chromosome 4 (mouse)
Band	4|4 D2.2	Start	124,880,223 bp
Band	4|4 D2.2	End	124,902,892 bp
RNA expression pattern
Bgee	Human / Mouse (ortholog); Top expressed in: canal of the cervix; body of uterus; germinal epithelium; ectocervix; right uterine tube; left uterine tube; myometrium; smooth muscle tissue; vagina; gastric mucosa / Top expressed in: superior surface of tongue; lens; gallbladder; epithelium of lens; efferent ductule; adventitia of seminal vesicle; papillary dermis; Stroma of ovary; muscle layer of seminal vesicle; lumbar spinal ganglion; More reference expression data
BioGPS	n/a
Gene ontology
Molecular function	heparin binding; signaling receptor binding; protein binding; G protein-coupled receptor binding; frizzled binding
Cellular component	extracellular region; nucleus; extracellular space
Biological process	positive regulation of canonical Wnt signaling pathway; positive regulation of Wnt signaling pathway; regulation of receptor internalization; positive regulation of protein phosphorylation; Wnt signaling pathway; response to stimulus
Sources:Amigo / QuickGO
Orthologs
Databases	NCBI: entry; OMA: entry
Species	Human	Mouse
Entrez	284654	192199
Ensembl	ENSG00000169218	ENSMUSG00000028871
UniProt	Q2MKA7	Q9Z132
RefSeq (mRNA)	NM_001038633; NM_001242908; NM_001242909; NM_001242910; NM_173640	NM_138683
RefSeq (protein)	NP_001033722; NP_001229837; NP_001229838; NP_001229839	NP_619624
Location (UCSC)	Chr 1: 37.61 – 37.63 Mb	Chr 4: 124.88 – 124.9 Mb
PubMed search
- Wikidata
View/Edit Human	View/Edit Mouse

R-spondin-1 is a secreted protein that in humans is encoded by the RSPO1 gene, found on chromosome 1. In humans, it interacts with WNT4 in the process of female sex development. Loss of function can cause female to male sex reversal. Furthermore, it promotes canonical WNT/β catenin signaling.

== Structure ==
The protein has two cysteine-rich, furin-like domains and one thrombospondin type 1 domain.

== Function ==
=== Sex development ===
==== Early gonads ====
RSPO1 is required for the early development of gonads, regardless of sex. It has been found in mice only eleven days after fertilization. To induce cell proliferation, it acts synergistically with WNT4. They help stabilize β-catenin, which activates downstream targets. If both are deficient in XY mice, there is less expression of SRY and a reduction in the amount of SOX9. Moreover, defects in vascularization are found. These occurrences result in testicular hypoplasia. Male to female sex reversal, however, does not occur because Leydig cells remain normal. They are maintained by steroidogenic cells, now unrepressed.

==== Ovaries ====
RSPO1 is necessary in female sex development. It augments the WNT/β catenin pathway to oppose male sex development. In critical gonadal stages, between six and nine weeks after fertilization, the ovaries upregulate it while the testes downregulate it.

=== Mucositis ===
Oral mucosa has been identified as a target tissue for RSPO1. When administered to normal mice, it causes nuclear translocation of β-catenin to this region. Modulation of the WNT/β catenin pathway occurs through the relief of Dkk1 inhibition. This occurrence results in increased basal cellularity, thickened mucosa, and elevated epithelial cell proliferation in the tongue. RSPO1 can therefore potentially aid in the treatment of mucositis, which is characterized by inflammation of the oral cavity. This unfortunate condition often accompanies chemotherapy and radiation in cancer patients with head and neck tumors. RSPO1 has also been shown to promote gastrointestinal epithelial cell proliferation in mice.
