= WNT4 =

Protein found in humans

Identifiers
- Aliases: WNT4, SERKAL, WNT-4, Wnt family member 4
- External IDs: OMIM: 603490; MGI: 98957; GeneCards: WNT4

Gene location (Human)
| Chr. | Chromosome 1 (human) |
| Band | 1p36.12 | Start | 22,117,313 bp |
| Band | 1p36.12 | End | 22,143,969 bp |

Gene location (Mouse)
| Chr. | Chromosome 4 (mouse) |
| Band | 4|4 D3 | Start | 137,004,800 bp |
| Band | 4|4 D3 | End | 137,027,037 bp |
RNA expression pattern
| Bgee | Human / Mouse (ortholog); Top expressed in: islet of Langerhans; decidua; beta cell; skin of thigh; palpebral conjunctiva; skin of abdomen; right ovary; left ovary; right adrenal cortex; skin of hip / Top expressed in: inner renal medulla; male urethra; hair follicle; conjunctival fornix; esophagus; gastrula; corneal stroma; islet of Langerhans; transitional epithelium of ureter; vestibular membrane of cochlear duct; More reference expression data |
| BioGPS | n/a |
Gene ontology
| Molecular function | transcription corepressor activity; signaling receptor binding; frizzled binding; receptor ligand activity |
| Cellular component | cytoplasm; endocytic vesicle membrane; endoplasmic reticulum lumen; extracellular region; cell surface; extracellular exosome; plasma membrane; Golgi lumen; extracellular space; extracellular matrix |
| Biological process | non-canonical Wnt signaling pathway; T cell differentiation in thymus; positive regulation of canonical Wnt signaling pathway; negative regulation of male gonad development; mesonephros development; androgen biosynthetic process; gamete generation; negative regulation of wound healing; metanephros development; cellular response to transforming growth factor beta stimulus; positive regulation of collagen biosynthetic process; mesonephric tubule development; cell fate commitment; mammary gland epithelium development; kidney development; negative regulation of cell differentiation; metanephric nephron morphogenesis; negative regulation of apoptotic signaling pathway; female sex determination; tube morphogenesis; smooth muscle cell differentiation; negative regulation of gene expression; female gonad development; positive regulation of transcription, DNA-templated; positive regulation of GTPase activity; branching involved in ureteric bud morphogenesis; kidney morphogenesis; nephron development; paramesonephric duct development; thyroid-stimulating hormone-secreting cell differentiation; hormone metabolic process; negative regulation of steroid biosynthetic process; tertiary branching involved in mammary gland duct morphogenesis; cell differentiation; male gonad development; positive regulation of aldosterone biosynthetic process; positive regulation of bone mineralization; anatomical structure development; somatotropin secreting cell differentiation; negative regulation of testicular blood vessel morphogenesis; metanephric mesenchymal cell differentiation; sex differentiation; metanephric nephron development; oocyte development; negative regulation of cell migration; positive regulation of osteoblast differentiation; renal vesicle formation; neuron differentiation; regulation of cell-cell adhesion; epithelial to mesenchymal transition; canonical Wnt signaling pathway; negative regulation of transcription, DNA-templated; branching morphogenesis of an epithelial tube; metanephric tubule formation; non-canonical Wnt signaling pathway via MAPK cascade; negative regulation of testosterone biosynthetic process; embryonic epithelial tube formation; positive regulation of cortisol biosynthetic process; positive regulation of dermatome development; cellular response to starvation; adrenal gland development; multicellular organism development; negative regulation of fibroblast growth factor receptor signaling pathway; renal vesicle induction; positive regulation of meiotic nuclear division; positive regulation of focal adhesion assembly; liver development; immature T cell proliferation in thymus; positive regulation of stress fiber assembly; mesenchymal to epithelial transition; Wnt signaling pathway; negative regulation of canonical Wnt signaling pathway; protein localization to plasma membrane; regulation of signaling receptor activity; negative regulation of androgen biosynthetic process |
Sources:Amigo / QuickGO
Orthologs
| Databases | NCBI: entry; OMA: entry |
| Species | Human | Mouse |
| Entrez | 54361 | 22417 |
| Ensembl | ENSG00000162552 | ENSMUSG00000036856 |
| UniProt | P56705 | P22724 |
| RefSeq (mRNA) | NM_030761 | NM_009523 |
| RefSeq (protein) | NP_110388 | NP_033549 |
| Location (UCSC) | Chr 1: 22.12 – 22.14 Mb | Chr 4: 137 – 137.03 Mb |
| PubMed search |
- Wikidata
| View/Edit Human | View/Edit Mouse |

WNT4 is a secreted protein that, in humans, is encoded by the WNT4 gene, found on chromosome 1. It promotes female sex development and represses male sex development. Loss of function may have consequences, such as female to male sex reversal.

== Function ==
The WNT gene family consists of structurally related genes that encode secreted signaling proteins. These proteins have been implicated in oncogenesis and in several developmental processes, including regulation of cell fate and embryogenesis.

=== Pregnancy ===
WNT4 is involved in many features of pregnancy as a downstream target of BMP2. For example, it regulates endometrial stromal cell proliferation, survival, and differentiation. These processes are all necessary for the development of an embryo. Ablation in female mice results in subfertility, with defects in implantation and decidualization. For instance, there is a decrease in responsiveness to progesterone signaling. Furthermore, postnatal uterine differentiation is characterized by a reduction in gland numbers and the stratification of the luminal epithelium.

=== Sexual development ===
==== Early gonads ====
Gonads arise from the thickening of coelomic epithelium, which at first appears as multiple cell layers. They later commit to sex determination, becoming either female or male under normal circumstances. Regardless of sex, though, WNT4 is needed for cell proliferation. In mouse gonads, it has been detected only eleven days after fertilization. If deficient in XY mice, there is a delay in Sertoli cell differentiation. Moreover, there is delay in sex cord formation. These issues are usually compensated for at birth.

WNT4 also interacts with RSPO1 early in development. If both are deficient in XY mice, the outcome is less expression of SRY and downstream targets. Furthermore, the amount of SOX9 is reduced and defects in vascularization are found. These occurrences result in testicular hypoplasia. Male to female sex reversal, however, does not occur because Leydig cells remain normal. They are maintained by steroidogenic cells, now unrepressed.

==== Female sexual development ====
Wnt4, is a growth factor and member of the Wnt gene family that acts through frizzled receptors and intracellular signals which lead to transcriptional activation of a host of genes. Wnt4 is involved in various developmental processes however, it is understood for its role in the development of the kidneys as well as in the development of the female reproductive tract and female secondary sex characteristics. Wnt4 is expressed in the developing kidney, the mesonephros and the mesenchyme of the bipotential gonad, and aids in development of the female reproductive tract. Specifically, by supporting oocyte development and regulating the formation of the mullerian duct, which will give rise to the oviduct, uterus, cervix and upper vagina. The growth factor also regulates steroidogenesis through upregulating genes such as Dax1, a gene expressed in the developing ovary and responsible for the inhibition of steroidogenic enzymes and ultimately the prevention of testis formation. Models utilizing knockout mice have shown that the absence of Wnt4 results in the presence of steroidogenic enzymes, masculinization of female genitalia, failure of the wolffian duct to regress, absence of the mullerian duct as well as a decrease in oocyte numbers. Studies utilizing the knockout mouse model have highlighted the importance of Wnt4 in female reproductive development.

==== Ovaries ====
WNT4 is required for female sex development. Upon secretion it binds to Frizzled receptors, activating a number of molecular pathways. One important example is the stabilization of β catenin, which increases the expression of target genes. For instance, TAFIIs 105 is now encoded, a subunit of the TATA binding protein for RNA polymerase in ovarian follicle cells. Without it, female mice have small ovaries with less mature follicles. In addition, the production of SOX9 is blocked. In humans, WNT4 also suppresses 5-α reductase activity, which converts testosterone into dihydrotestosterone. External male genitalia are therefore not formed. Moreover, it contributes to the formation of the Müllerian duct, a precursor to female reproductive organs.

==== Male sexual development ====
The absence of WNT4 is required for male sex development. FGF signaling suppresses WNT4, acting in a feed forward loop triggered by SOX9. If this signaling is deficient in XY mice, female genes are unrepressed. With no FGFR2, there is a partial sex reversal. With no FGF9, there is a full sex reversal. Both cases are rescued, though, by a WNT4 deletion. In these double mutants, the resulting somatic cells are normal.

=== Kidneys ===
WNT4 is essential for nephrogenesis. It regulates kidney tubule induction and the mesenchymal to epithelial transformation in the cortical region. In addition, it influences the fate of the medullary stroma during development. Without it, smooth muscle α actin is markedly reduced. This occurrence causes pericyte deficiency around the vessels, leading to a defect in maturation. WNT4 probably functions by activating BMP4, a known smooth muscle differentiation factor.

=== Muscles ===
WNT4 contributes to the formation of the neuromuscular junction in vertebrates. Expression is high during the creation of first synaptic contacts, but subsequently downregulated. Moreover, loss of function causes a 35 percent decrease in the number of acetylcholine receptors. Overexpression, however, causes an increase. These events alter fiber type composition with the production of more slow fibers. Lastly, MuSK is the receptor for WNT4, activated through tyrosine phosphorylation. It contains a CRD domain similar to Frizzled receptors.

=== Lungs ===
WNT4 is also associated with lung formation and has a role in the formation of the respiratory system. When WNT4 is knocked out, there are many problems that occur in lung development. It has been shown that when WNT4 is knocked out, the lung buds formed are reduced in size and proliferation has greatly diminished which cause underdeveloped or incomplete development of the lungs. It also causes tracheal abnormalities because it affects the tracheal cartilage ring formation. Lastly, the absence of WNT4 also affects the expression of other genes that function in lung development such as Sox9 and FGF9.

== Clinical significance ==
=== Deficiency ===
Several mutations are known to cause loss of function in WNT4. One example is a heterozygous C to T transition in exon 2. This causes an arginine to cysteine substitution at amino acid position 83, a conserved location. The formation of illegitimate sulfide bonds creates a misfolded protein, resulting in loss of function. In XX humans, WNT4 now cannot stabilize β-catenin. Furthermore, steroidogenic enzymes like CYP17A1 and HSD3B2 are not suppressed, leading to an increase in testosterone production. Along with this androgen excess, patients have no uteruses. Other Müllerian abnormalities, however, are not found. This disorder is therefore distinct from classic Mayer–Rokitansky–Kuster–Hauser syndrome.

=== SERKAL syndrome ===
A disruption of WNT4 synthesis in XX humans produces SERKAL syndrome. The genetic mutation is a homozygous C to T transition at cDNA position 341. This causes an alanine to valine residue substitution at amino acid position 114, a location highly conserved in all organisms, including zebrafish and Drosophila. The result is loss of function, which affects mRNA stability. Ultimately it causes female to male sex reversal.

=== Mayer–rokitansky–kuster–hauser syndrome ===
WNT4 has been clearly implicated in the atypical version of Mayer–Rokitansky–Kuster–Hauser syndrome found in XX humans. A genetic mutation causes a leucine to proline residue substitution at amino acid position 12. This occurrence reduces the intranuclear levels of β-catenin. In addition, it removes the inhibition of steroidogenic enzymes like 3β-hydroxysteriod dehydrogenase and 17α-hydroxylase. Patients usually have uterine hypoplasia, which is associated with biological symptoms of androgen excess. Furthermore, Müllerian abnormalities are often found.
