= SERKAL syndrome =

- Other names: SEx Reversion, Kidneys, Adrenal and Lung dysgenesis

SERKAL syndrome (SEx Reversion, Kidneys, Adrenal and Lung dysgenesis) is an autosomal recessive disorder in XX humans. It is caused by loss of function in WNT4, a protein involved in sex development. The main outcome is female to male sex reversal. Other names include sex reversion-kidneys and adrenal and lung dysgenesis syndrome. The condition's prevalence is lower than 1 in 1,000,000.

== Presentation ==
The effect of the disorder is female to male sex reversal. Patients also exhibit renal, adrenal, and lung dysgenesis. One indicator is low levels of unconjugated estriol in maternal serum, because this denotes adrenal hypoplasia.

== Genetics ==
The disorder is linked to a mutation in the Wnt4 gene. There is an intraexonic homozygous C to T transition at cDNA position 341. This leads to an alanine to valine residue substitution at amino acid position 114, a location highly conserved in all organisms, including zebrafish and Drosophila. A subsequent influence on mRNA stability leads to protein loss of function. WNT4 usually represses male sex development.
