= XX male syndrome =

Congenital condition where an individual with a 46,XX karyotype is male

- Other names: De la Chapelle syndrome
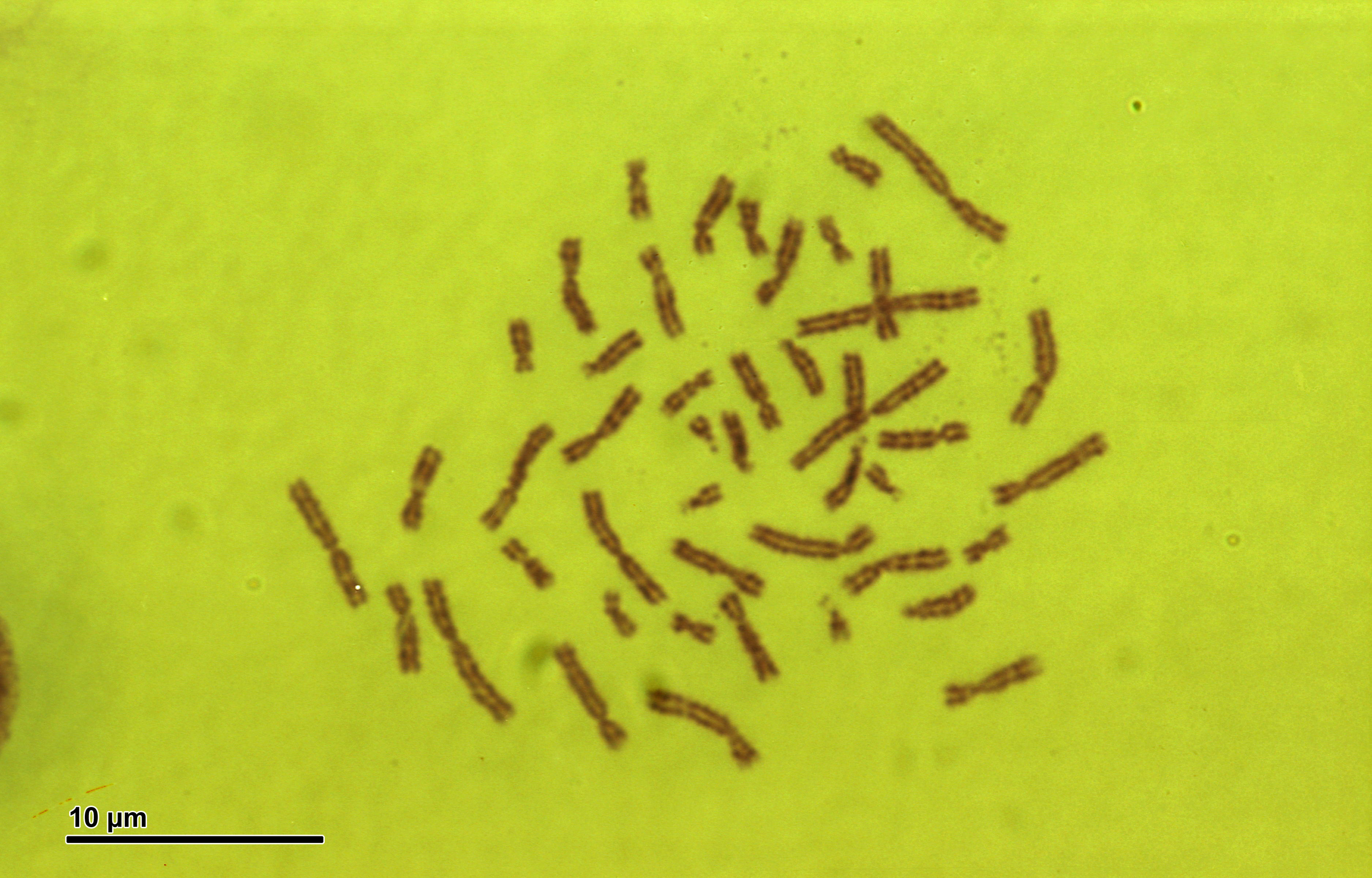
- Human karyotype 46,XX
- Specialty: Medical genetics
- Frequency: 1 in 20,000
- Named after: Albert de la Chapelle

XX male syndrome, also known as de la Chapelle syndrome or 46,XX testicular disorder of sex development (or 46,XX DSD) is a rare condition in which an individual with a 46,XX karyotype develops a male phenotype.

In 90 percent of these individuals, the syndrome is caused by the father's Y chromosome's SRY gene being atypically included in the crossing over of genetic information that takes place between the pseudoautosomal regions of the X and Y chromosomes during meiosis in the father. When the X with the SRY gene combines with a normal X from the mother during fertilization, the result is an XX genetic male. Less common are SRY-negative individuals, who appear to be XX genetic females, which is caused by a mutation in an autosomal or X chromosomal gene. Masculinization in those with the condition is variable, and those with the condition are sterile.

This syndrome is diagnosed and occurs in approximately 1 in 20,000 newborn boys, making it much less common than Klinefelter syndrome. Medical treatment of the condition varies, with medical treatment usually not necessary. The clinical name "de la Chapelle syndrome", was named after the Finnish scientist Albert de la Chapelle, who first described the condition.

== Signs and symptoms ==
While there is some degree of variability, a majority of those diagnosed with de la Chapelle Syndrome have a typical male phenotype, with male-typical external genitalia, making early diagnosis uncommon. Genital ambiguity is seen most commonly in individuals without the SRY gene or other Y chromosome-derived genes, though reported rates are inconsistent. These ambiguities can include traits such as hypospadias, micropenis, and cryptorchidism. In most SRY-positive men, there are few significant signs before puberty, though small testes appear an almost universal finding; following puberty, with gynecomastia often developing. XX males appear to be shorter on average than XY males.

Based on limited evidence, most typically have typical body and pubic hair, penis size, libido, and erectile function. In all reported cases, individuals have been sterile, with azoospermia (no sperm in the ejaculate). Due to its often-subtle presentation, many do not get diagnosed until seeking treatment for infertility in adulthood; it is likely a significant proportion of cases remain undiagnosed.

=== Masculinization ===
The degree to which individuals with XX male syndrome develop the male phenotype is variable, even among SRY-positive individuals.

Masculinization of SRY-positive XX males is believed to be dependent on which X chromosome is made inactive. Typical XX females undergo X-inactivation during which one copy of the X chromosome is silenced. It is thought that X-inactivation in XX males may account for the genital ambiguities and incomplete masculinization seen in SRY-positive XX males. The X chromosome with the SRY gene is preferentially chosen to be the active X chromosome 90% of the time, which explains complete male phenotype being observed often in the SRY-positive version of the condition. In the remaining 10%, however, X-inactivation occurs on the X chromosome with the SRY gene, thereby silencing it and resulting in incomplete masculinization.

Masculinization of SRY-negative individuals is dependent upon which genes have mutations and at what point in development these mutations occur.

== Genetics ==
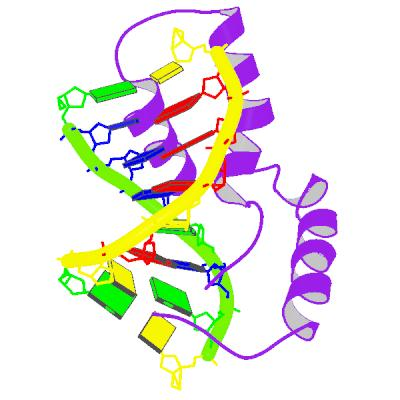
SRY Protein

Males typically have one X chromosome and one Y chromosome in each diploid cell of their bodies. Females typically have two X chromosomes. Of the majority of XX males that are SRY-positive (or XX genetic males) have two X chromosomes, with one of them containing genetic material (the SRY gene) from the Y chromosome; this gene causes them to develop a male phenotype despite having chromosomes more typical of females. Some 46,XX individuals, however, do not have the SRY gene (SRY-negative); the reason a male phenotype develops is poorly understood, and subject to further research.

=== SRY-positive ===
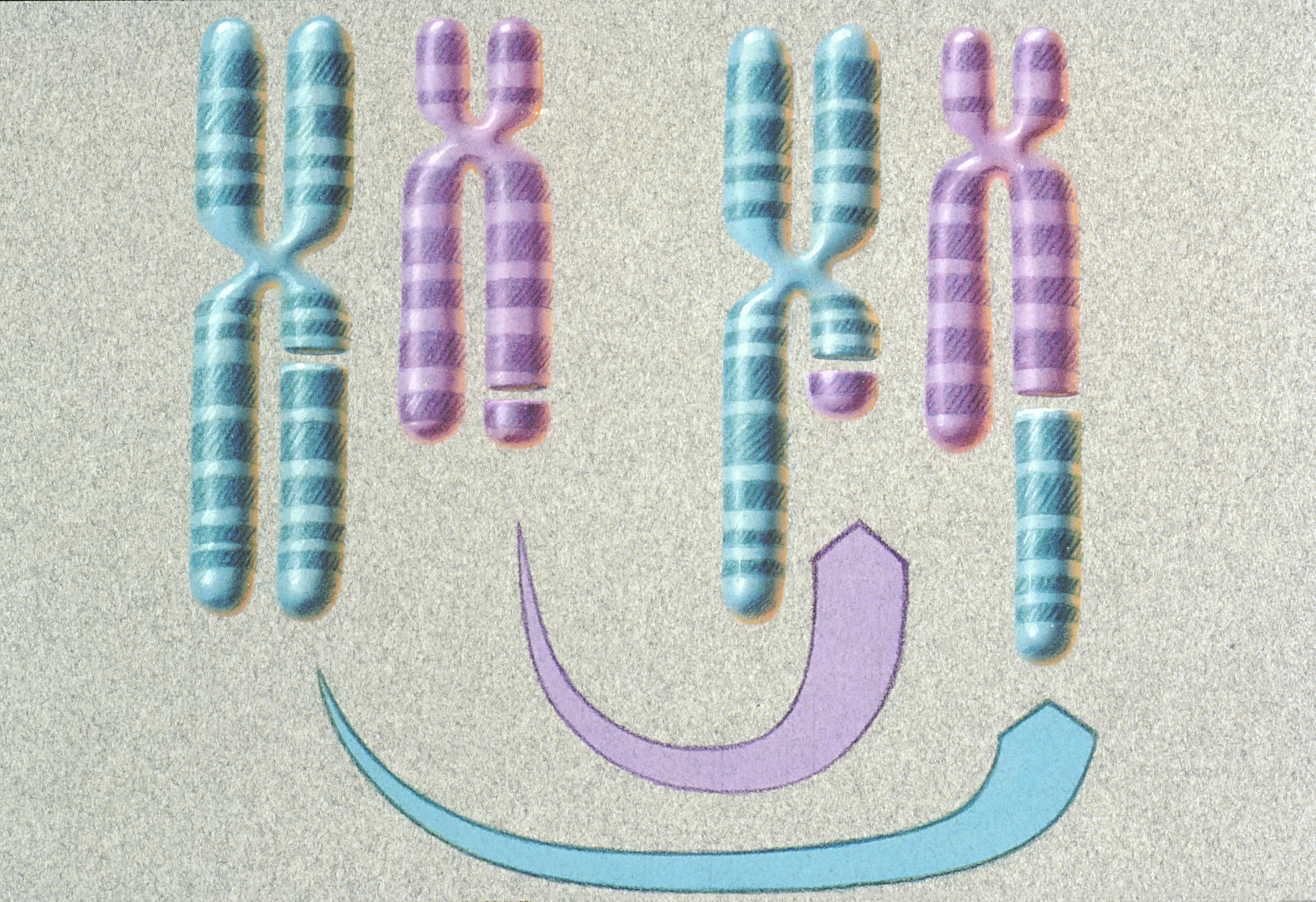
An example of translocation between two chromosomes

The SRY gene, normally found on the Y chromosome, plays an important role in sex determination by initiating testicular development. In about 80 percent of XX males, the SRY gene is present on one of the X chromosomes.

The condition results from an abnormal exchange of genetic material between chromosomes (translocation). This exchange occurs as a random event during the formation of sperm cells in the affected person's father. The tip of the Y chromosome contains the SRY gene and, during recombination, a translocation occurs in which the SRY gene becomes part of the X chromosome. If a fetus is conceived from a sperm cell with an X chromosome bearing the SRY gene, it will develop as a male despite not having the full Y chromosome. This form of the condition is called SRY-positive 46,XX testicular disorder of sex development.

=== SRY-negative ===
About 20 percent of those with 46,XX testicular disorder of sex development do not have the SRY gene. This form of the condition is called SRY-negative 46,XX testicular disorder of sex development. The cause of the disorder in these individuals is often unknown, although changes affecting other genes have been identified. Individuals with SRY-negative 46,XX testicular disorder of sex development are more likely to have ambiguous genitalia than are people with the SRY-positive form.

The exact cause of this condition is unknown, but three theories have been proposed: first, undetected gonadal mosaicism for SRY; second, de-repression of male development due to mutations in genes on chromosomes other than the Y chromosome; third, altered expression of other genes downstream of SRY, resulting in masculinisation. For example, it has been proposed that mutations in the SOX9 gene may contribute to this syndrome, as SOX9 plays a role in testes differentiation during development. Another proposed cause is mutations to the DAX1 gene, which may suppress masculinisation; if there is a loss of function of DAX1, then testes can develop in an XX individual. Mutations in SF1 and WNT4 genes have also been studied as a potential cause.

== Diagnosis ==
There is no consensus on the diagnostic criteria; diagnosis typically involves evaluating the individual's physical development in combination with karyotyping, and presence of the SRY gene or associated genes, such as SOX9. Tests for hormone levels and azoospermia may also be completed.

Most with de la Chapelle Syndrome have a typical male-type phenotype at birth, so diagnosis tends to occur either at the onset of puberty, if traits such as gynaecomastia develop and are investigated, or later, when investigating infertility. Diagnosis at birth occurs more frequently in SRY-negative individuals, who are more likely to have ambiguous genitalia.

In cases where the individual is being evaluated for ambiguous genitalia, such as a small phallus, hypospadias, or labioscrotal folds, exploratory surgery may be used to determine if male and/or female internal genitalia is present. Indicators include two testes which have not descended the inguinal canal, although this is seen in a minority of XX males, and the absence of Müllerian tissue. External indicators include decreased body weight, gynecomastia, and small testes.

A standard karyotype can be completed to cytogenetically determine that an individual with a partial or complete male phenotype has an XX genotype. The presence and location of the SRY gene can by determined using fluorescence in situ hybridization (FISH).

== Treatment ==
Treatments are generally focused on affirming the gender presentation of affected men, vary to a large degree based on the phenotype of the individual, and may include counselling. In some XX males, testosterone therapy may be used to increase virilisation. While the vast majority of XX males have typical male external genital development, cases of genital ambiguity may be treated with hormonal therapy, surgery, or both. In some cases, gonadal surgery can be performed to remove partial or whole female genitalia. This may be followed by plastic and reconstructive surgery to make the individual appear more externally male. Conversely, the individual may wish to become more feminine and feminizing genitoplasty can be performed to make the ambiguous genitalia appear more female.

There is no treatment for infertility in XX males – supportive management and alternatives such as sperm donation or adoption are recommended.

== Epidemiology ==
It is estimated that 1 of every 20,000 to 30,000 males has a 46,XX karyotype, making it much less common than other related syndromes, such as Klinefelter syndrome.

== See also ==
- Sex chromosome anomalies
- X chromosome, for other conditions related to the X chromosome.
- Sex-determining region Y protein
- XY gonadal dysgenesis
- Karyotype
- Disorders of sex development
