= Sex reversal =

Biological process

Sex reversal is a biological process whereby the pathway directed towards the already determined-sex fate is flipped towards the opposite sex, creating a discordance between the primary sex fate and the sex phenotype expressed. The process of sex reversal occurs during embryonic development or before gonad differentiation. In GSD species, sex reversal means that the sexual phenotype is discordant with the genetic/chromosomal sex. In TSD species, sex reversal means that the temperature/conditions that usually trigger the differentiation towards one sexual phenotype are producing the opposite sexual phenotype.

Sex reversal can occur naturally, by mutations, or can be induced artificially. Sex reversal can be genetically or hormonally induced in laboratory. It can also occur artificially by exposure to endocrine disruptors such as pollutants, including herbicides, which can act as estrogen promoters or inhibitors, for instance by altering aromatase expression.

== In fish ==
Gonochoristic Fish

In gonochoristic fish, the sex can be determined genetically, environmentally or by a combination of both. In fish, primary sexual fate can be susceptible to alteration by hormones exposure and multiple environmental factors, such as population density, water pH, or temperature. Those conditions can affect the gonad development and differentiation, which can lead to sex reversal. In medaka fish, where sex reversal has been documented show a shared gene related to normal male development, the dmy gene. In wild populations, genetically female fate can be phenotypically reversed to males if they carry the dmy gene or a mutated dmy gene and genetic males can be reversed to females if they lack the dmy gene.

Hermaphroditic Fish

Within seven teleost fish families, two modes of hermaphrodism can be observed—simultaneous hermaphrodism and sequential hermaphrodism. These cases often arise due to social factors, such as a decline in population or changes in dominance. It is assumed that hermaphroditic sex changing fish have increased plasticity within their gonads compared to the typical gonochoristic fish, allowing for gonadal differentiation. Although it is not a reversal of sex, simultaneous hermaphrodism is beneficial for low-density populations as it allows for an increase in conspecific mating opportunities overall. Simultaneous hermaphrodism occurs when fish are able to produce both mature sperm and eggs within their gonads—while self-fertilization is rare, it has been seen to occur in few low-density populations such as the Kryptolebias marmoratus. Sequential hermaphrodism occurs when gonadal sex redifferentiation takes place, often due to a decrease in the population of a specific sex. This form of hermaphrodism has taken upon three modes—protogyny, protandry, and bi-directional sex change.

Protogynous sex change is the female to male gonadal redifferentiation, and it is often found within species that practice haremic polygyny, or one male reproducing with many females. When socially dominant males disappear, larger initial phase female fish will undergo sex change to become terminal phase males. In this, the ovaries are constructed to mature, functional testis. Protogyny sex change has been found within fish species such as the three-spot wrasse (Halichoreres trimaculatas) and the saddleback wrasse (Thalassoma duperrey) with a decline in plasma estrogen contributing to testis development.

In contrast, protandrous sex change is the male to female gonadal redifferentiation, but it is also triggered by the disappearance of the conspecific dominant, in this case the female. While protogynous fish are found within species dominated by larger males, protandrous fish are within large female dominant species, such as the clown fish (Amphiprion). Within the clown fish populations, males develop bi-sexual gonads—mature testis and immature ovaries—while the dominant females only possess ovaries. In cases of protandrous sex change, the immature ovarian tissues develop and the testicular tissues deteriorate due to changes in the activity of gonadal steroid hormones such as estrogen.

Bi-directional, or serial, sex change occurs when hermaphrodites are capable of changing their sex in either direction, possibly multiple times. Some fish species are capable of this sex change due to the presence of both ovaries and testis, with only one gonad actively producing gametic cells at a time. The activation of a gonad is possible through changes in expression of the gonadotropin receptors. This primarily occurs in cases of male-male and female-female mating pairs, with the smaller male changing to female or the larger female changing to male due to the disappearance of the respective sex. This can be found in the Okinawa rubble gobiid fish (Trimma okinawae) whose mating system consists of a polygynous harem. When the dominant male is removed, the largest female changes its sex to male; if the dominant male is reintroduced, the sex can be reversed back to female.

=== Induced reversal in aquaculture industry ===
In aquaculture, sex control is important due to the role of sex in growth and reproduction. In fish, growth rates can be different between sexes. These differences can affect their economic value. Producing a monosex fish population can improve product quality and therefore generates higher financial profit.

Hormone-induced sex reversal is the most frequent method used in aquaculture. It consists of exposing sexually undifferentiated fish to sex steroids. There are other methods to induced sex reversal in fish such as chromosomal/genetic manipulation, hybridization, or treatments influencing sex determination or gonad differentiation (e.g. temperature, population density, pH, social factors).

== In amphibians ==
Sex is genetically determined in amphibians. Temperature-induced sex reversal has been documented in some species of anuran and caudate amphibians. Temperature only can have an effect on sex differentiation during a window period called thermosensitive period (TSP) which varies among species. Tadpoles or larvae exposed to specific higher or lower temperatures, depending on the temperature thresholds of the species, can differentiate gonads that do not align with their primary sexual fate.

Amphibian sex reversal can be also induced by exposure to sex steroid and pollutants. Endocrine disruptors can affect gonad differentiation, and therefore induce sex reversal. Exposure to ethylnyl estradiol (EE_{2}) and bisphenol A (BPA) induces feminizing effects. Masculinizing effects can be induced by exposure to the drug trenbolone, used in cattle.

Research in wild populations of the North American green frog has demonstrated that sex reversal is common. This work shows that genetic females sex reverse into phenotypic males and that genetic males sex reverse into phenotypic females, providing evidence that sex reversal can be bidirectional in amphibians. While endocrine disrupting chemical contamination is known from laboratory experiments to cause sex reversal in amphibians, sex reversal in green frogs occurs irrespective of contamination, suggesting sex reversal is a natural process in amphibians

== In reptiles ==
Sex in reptiles can be determined genetically (GSD), environmentally (ESD) or by an interaction of both. Sex reversal has been documented in detail in wild populations of the central bearded dragon Pogona vitticeps, and in the eastern three-lined skink Bassiana duperreyi. In these species, their genetically determined sex is overridden by temperature influence.

Further, there are certain primitive reptiles (some chelonians, some crocodilians, and one lizard species) that undergo Temperature-dependent Sex Determination (TSD) during their egg incubation (a form of ESD). TSD functions within a transitional range of temperature (TRT) that influences the sex of the egg and a pivotal temperature that would give rise to a 50:50 chance of females:males. For these reptiles that exhibit TSD, the egg is sensitive to temperature in the middle-third of incubation. The sex of the eggs could be reversed or "corrected" (shifting from one sex, to another, and back to the original) during later stages of the middle-third of incubation if the temperature is shifted.

Sex reversal in reptiles can be induced by hormonal manipulation, treatments influencing sex determination (e.g. temperature) or by inhibition of the aromatase gene (CYP19A1) which causes sex reversal from female to male phenotype. Further, estradiol-17β has been shown to reverse the sex of turtle species when injected into incubating eggs. These eggs were originally placed in are male producing temperatures, but with the estradiol-17β treatment, they would generate females. However, hormone-based sex reversal would be dependent on the gonadal development stages of the embryo (the middle-third of incubation).

== In birds ==
In birds, sex reversal has been documented in natural and experimental conditions. Sex steroid manipulation (such as hormones including androgens, estrogens, and progestogens) can induce sex reversal in birds by interacting with vertebrae and hormone receptors. Aromatase inhibitors injected into chicken eggs before the gonadal differentiation stage induce testis development in ZW embryos.

Sex reversal in chickens form almost identical phenotypes, which characteristics of an expression of the individual genotype with the environment and the genotype being the presentation or its makeup. The sex orientation in birds is a mix of direct genetic and hormonal mechanisms. Birds show strong sexually dimorphism, where birds from the same species having two different forms. The male bird is bright colored while the female bird is drab or "dull" in color with no radiant or vibrant color to it at all.

A study of about 500 birds from five Australian species (the Australian magpie, laughing kookaburra, crested pigeon, rainbow lorikeet, and scaly-breasted lorikeet) found that sex reversals happened at a frequency of 3–6%, and identified a genetically male kookaburra that had recently laid an egg.

== In mammals ==
Sex reversal in mammals has been documented in domestic species such as cattle, water buffalo, horses, dogs, cats, pigs, goats, etc. Sex reversal in these species usually relates to genetic changes and the resulting phenotype is often associated with gonadal malformation. Natural sex reversal without disruptive effects on fertility has been documented in several rodents, including Myopus schisticolor, Dicrostonyx torquatus, Akodon, Mus minutoides, Microtus cabrerae. In these species some individuals genetically determined as males develop typical ovarian structure. In these rodents species, sex reversal mainly occurs after mutational events.

In mammals, sex reversal occurs when the gonadal or sexual phenotype does not align with the genetic sex determined by the XX/XY or ZZ/ZW chromosomal system. The development of an ovary and female phenotype in an individual with XY chromosomes represents the instance of sex reversal in mammals. Research has identified various genes involved in mammalian sex determination and differentiation. SRY (Sex-determining Region Y) in humans and mice is one of the sex-determination genes that plays a significant function in initiating male development. Mutations or anomalies can affect these sex-determining genes resulting in sex reversal phenotypes.

Additionally, hormonal factors play a significant role in sex reversal among mammals. Estrogen and ovarian hormones facilitate female development whereas testosterone and anti-Müllerian hormone (AMH) produced by the testes promote male development. However, disruptions in hormone signaling pathways can lead to sex reversal. For instance, exposure to estrogen during critical periods of development can interfere with normal hormone levels and can cause sex reversal phenotypes.

Sex reversal in mammals can be impacted by ecological factors such as habitat destruction, and resource availability. Changes in environmental conditions may influence the frequency of sex reversal within mammalian populations, ultimately affecting population dynamics and ecosystem functioning. Understanding sex reversal in mammals is crucial for wildlife conservation efforts, particularly in species facing threats such as habitat loss, and pollution. Sex reversal can potentially influence the long-term viability of populations by altering population demographics, reproductive success, and genetic diversity.

Furthermore, sex reversal can lead to behavioral adaptations within mammalian populations as individuals navigate their altered reproductive roles and social dynamics. Research findings have demonstrated changes in mating behaviors, dominance hierarchies, and social interactions among individuals with sex reversal phenotypes. The evolutionary significance of sex reversal and its impact on population dynamics and social structure can be studied by understanding the mechanism of behavioral adaptations.

== See also ==
- Sex-determination system
- Sequential hermaphroditism
- Temperature-dependent sex determination
- Teratogenesis
