= FGF9 =

Protein-coding gene in the species Homo sapiens

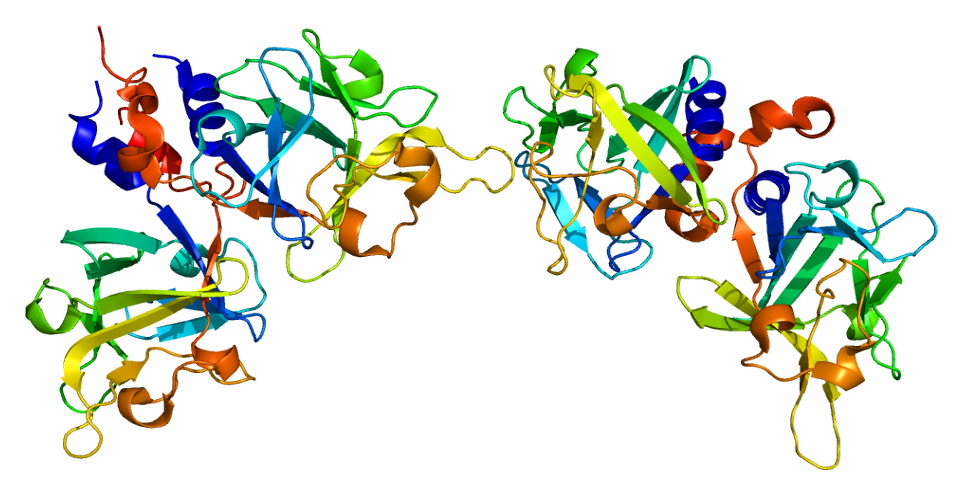

Identifiers
- Aliases: FGF9, FGF-9, GAF, HBFG-9, HBGF-9, SYNS3, fibroblast growth factor 9
- External IDs: OMIM: 600921; MGI: 104723; GeneCards: FGF9
Available structures
| PDB | Ortholog search: PDBe RCSB |
| PDB | List of PDB id codes 1G82, 1IHK |

Gene location (Human)
| Chr. | Chromosome 13 (human) |
| Band | 13q12.11 | Start | 21,671,073 bp |
| Band | 13q12.11 | End | 21,704,498 bp |

Gene location (Mouse)
| Chr. | Chromosome 14 (mouse) |
| Band | 14 C3|14 30.51 cM | Start | 58,308,004 bp |
| Band | 14 C3|14 30.51 cM | End | 58,350,177 bp |
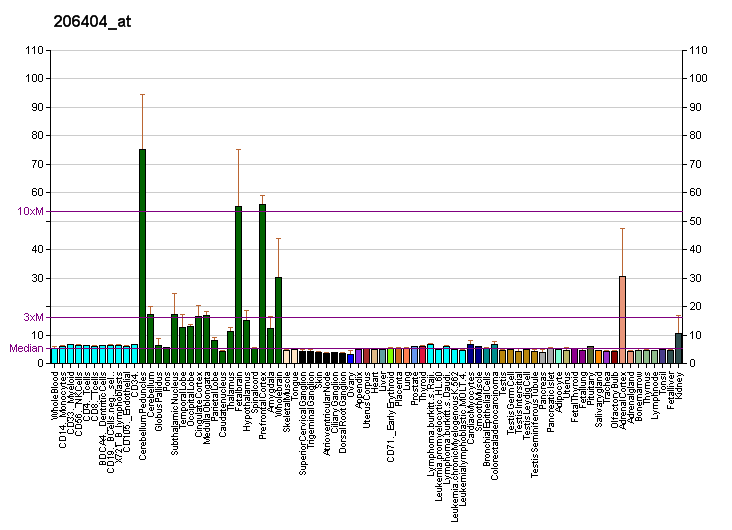
RNA expression pattern
| Bgee | Human / Mouse (ortholog); Top expressed in: secondary oocyte; renal medulla; Brodmann area 23; pons; buccal mucosa cell; cerebellar vermis; middle temporal gyrus; parietal pleura; germinal epithelium; paraflocculus of cerebellum / Top expressed in: vestibular membrane of cochlear duct; deep cerebellar nuclei; internal carotid artery; facial motor nucleus; pontine nuclei; muscle layer of urethra; substantia nigra; medial vestibular nucleus; lateral geniculate nucleus; cerebellar vermis; More reference expression data |
| BioGPS | More reference expression data |
Gene ontology
| Molecular function | heparin binding; fibroblast growth factor receptor binding; protein tyrosine kinase activity; phosphatidylinositol-4,5-bisphosphate 3-kinase activity; 1-phosphatidylinositol-3-kinase activity; growth factor activity |
| Cellular component | cytoplasm; extracellular region; basement membrane; extracellular exosome; extracellular space |
| Biological process | eye development; positive regulation of vascular endothelial growth factor receptor signaling pathway; cell differentiation; male gonad development; chondrocyte differentiation; substantia nigra development; protein import into nucleus; positive regulation of smoothened signaling pathway; regulation of timing of cell differentiation; positive regulation of epithelial cell proliferation; lung development; positive regulation of canonical Wnt signaling pathway; negative regulation of Wnt signaling pathway; negative regulation of transcription by RNA polymerase II; male sex determination; MAPK cascade; embryonic skeletal system development; multicellular organism development; positive regulation of gene expression; positive regulation of activin receptor signaling pathway; positive regulation of cardiac muscle cell proliferation; positive regulation of mesenchymal cell proliferation; embryonic limb morphogenesis; inner ear morphogenesis; angiogenesis; osteoblast differentiation; positive regulation of cell population proliferation; lung-associated mesenchyme development; embryonic digestive tract development; positive regulation of cell division; signal transduction; positive regulation of MAPK cascade; phosphatidylinositol phosphate biosynthetic process; fibroblast growth factor receptor signaling pathway; cell-cell signaling; phosphatidylinositol-3-phosphate biosynthetic process; peptidyl-tyrosine phosphorylation; regulation of signaling receptor activity; positive regulation of protein kinase B signaling; regulation of molecular function; positive regulation of vascular associated smooth muscle cell proliferation; positive regulation of vascular associated smooth muscle cell migration; negative regulation of vascular associated smooth muscle cell differentiation involved in phenotypic switching |
Sources:Amigo / QuickGO
Orthologs
| Databases | NCBI: entry; OMA: entry |
| Species | Human | Mouse |
| Entrez | 2254 | 14180 |
| Ensembl | ENSG00000102678 | ENSMUSG00000021974 |
| UniProt | P31371 | P54130 |
| RefSeq (mRNA) | NM_002010 | NM_013518 |
| RefSeq (protein) | NP_002001 | NP_038546 |
| Location (UCSC) | Chr 13: 21.67 – 21.7 Mb | Chr 14: 58.31 – 58.35 Mb |
| PubMed search |
- Wikidata
| View/Edit Human | View/Edit Mouse |

Glia-activating factor is a protein that in humans is encoded by the FGF9 gene.

== Function ==
The protein encoded by this gene is a member of the fibroblast growth factor (FGF) family. FGF family members possess broad mitogenic and cell survival activities, and are involved in a variety of biological processes, including embryonic development, cell growth, morphogenesis, tissue repair, tumor growth and invasion. This protein was isolated as a secreted factor that exhibits a growth-stimulating effect on cultured glial cells. In the nervous system, this protein is produced mainly by neurons and may be important for glial cell development. Expression of the mouse homolog of this gene was found to be dependent on Sonic hedgehog (Shh) signaling. Mice lacking the homolog gene displayed a male-to-female sex reversal phenotype, which suggested a role in testicular embryogenesis. This gene is involved in the patterning of sex determination, lung development, and skeletal development.

=== Sex determination ===
FGF9 has also been shown to play a vital role in male sex development. FGF9's role in sex determination begins with its expression in the bi-potent gonads for both females and males. Once activated by SOX9, it is responsible for forming a feedforward loop with Sox9, increasing the levels of both genes. It forms a positive feedback loop upregulating SOX9, while simultaneously inactivating the female Wnt4 signaling pathway.

=== Lung development ===
In lung development, FGF9 is expressed in the mesothelium and pulmonary epithelium, where its purpose is to retain lung mesenchymal proliferation. Inactivation of FGF9 results in diminished epithelial branching. By the end of gestation, the lungs that are developed cannot sustain life and will result in a prenatal death.

FGF9, which encodes for a fibroblast growth factor signaling protein, is vital for lung development. It is expressed in both the mesothelium, which will later differentiate into the pleura, as well as the pulmonary epithelium, which differentiates into the airways. The gene controls mesenchymal proliferation and as development progresses, there is a lower expression of the gene present in the epithelium although it persists in the mesenchymal cells. Inactivation causes diminished epithelial branching, as well as underdeveloped lungs, which often results in neonatal death. In the FGF9 knockout mice, death is common before, or within a few weeks of, birth due to the absence of adequate lung development. Lower ratios of mesenchymal tissue are also observed in these mice. Research has been conducted on knockout mice to assess the development of lungs without the presence of Fgf9. It has been found that Fgf9 is also vital for Shh (Sonic Hedgehog) signaling and function, as both genes work in tandem to determine lung structure and branching.

=== Skeletal development ===
Another biological role presented by this gene is its involvement in skeletal development and repair. FGF9 and FGF18 both stimulate chondrocyte proliferation. FGF9 heterozygous mutant mice had a compromised bone repair after an injury with less expression of VEGF and VEGFR2 and lower osteoclast recruitment. One disease associated with this gene is multiple synostoses syndrome (SYNS), a rare bone disease that has to do with the fusion of the fingers and toes. A missense mutation in the second exon of the FGF9 gene, the S99N mutation, seems to be the third cause of SYNS. A mutation in Noggin (NOG) and the Growth Differentiation Factor 5 (GDF5) are the other two causes of SYNS. The S99N mutation results in cell signaling irregularities that interfere with chondrogenesis and osteogenesis causing the fusion of the joints during development.

=== Metabolism and bone-adipose homeostasis ===
Furthermore, FGF9 serves as an important regulator of metabolic processes, particularly in bone and adipose tissue homeostasis. In the bone marrow microenvironment, FGF9 influences the fate of bone marrow mesenchymal stem cells (BMSCs), which can differentiate into either osteoblasts or adipocytes. Studies demonstrate that FGF9 promotes adipogenic differentiation while suppressing osteogenesis, thereby regulating the balance between bone formation and bone marrow adipose tissue accumulation. Mechanistically, this effect is mediated through signaling pathways such as PI3K/AKT, Hippo, and MAPK/ERK.

=== Knockout and functional evidence ===
Lastly, functional studies using animal models have demonstrated that FGF9 is essential for normal development and physiological function. Loss-of-function mutations and gene ablation studies reveal that disruption of FGF9 signaling leads to significant developmental abnormalities, including defects in lung formation and male-to-female sex reversal.

In addition to these developmental defects, experimental knockdown models demonstrate that FGF9 plays a critical role in metabolic homeostasis. Reduced expression of FGF9 leads to increased lipid accumulation in hepatocytes and exacerbates metabolic disease phenotypes, including insulin resistance and fatty liver disease. In contrast, overexpression models show protective effects against these conditions.

Additionally, FGF9 knockout and mutation models also provide insight into skeletal biology. In particular, Fgf9⁻/⁻ mice exhibit reduced blood vessel formation in long bones, leading to delayed mineralization center formation and ultimately resulting in shortened skeletal segments. Histomorphological and cytodifferentiation analyses also demonstrate that Fgf9 loss-of-function mutations alter bone marrow adipose tissue dynamics, including reduced BMAT formation and alleviation of ovariectomy-induced bone loss and BMAT accumulation.

Finally, beyond the aforementioned roles, studies have also demonstrated that FGF9 is critical during early pregnancy. FGF9 expression is tightly regulated and peaks at the time of embryo implantation, where it is localized to the uterine epithelium surrounding the blastocyst and contributes to the establishment of a microenvironment necessary for successful implantation and pregnancy maintenance.

== Interactions ==
FGF9 has been shown to interact with Fibroblast growth factor receptor 3.
