= SOX9 =

Transcription factor gene of the SOX family

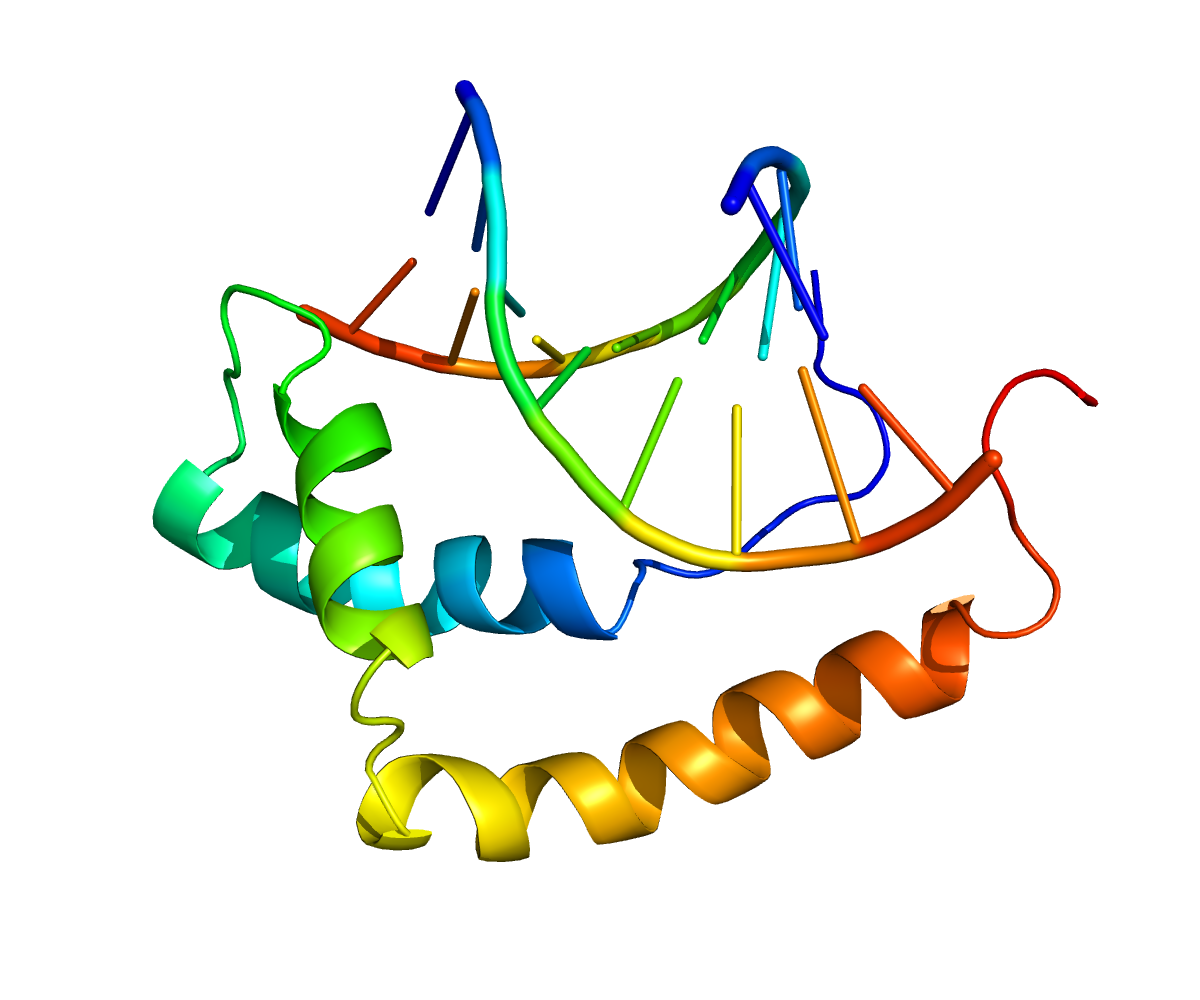

Identifiers
- Aliases: SOX9, CMD1, CMPD1, SRA1, SRXX2, SRXY10, SRY-box 9, SRY-box transcription factor 9
- External IDs: OMIM: 608160; MGI: 98371; GeneCards: SOX9
Available structures
PDB	Ortholog search: PDBe RCSB
PDB	List of PDB id codes 4EUW

Gene location (Human)
Chr.	Chromosome 17 (human)
Band	17q24.3	Start	72,121,020 bp
Band	17q24.3	End	72,126,416 bp

Gene location (Mouse)
Chr.	Chromosome 11 (mouse)
Band	11 E2|11 77.27 cM	Start	112,673,050 bp
Band	11 E2|11 77.27 cM	End	112,678,586 bp
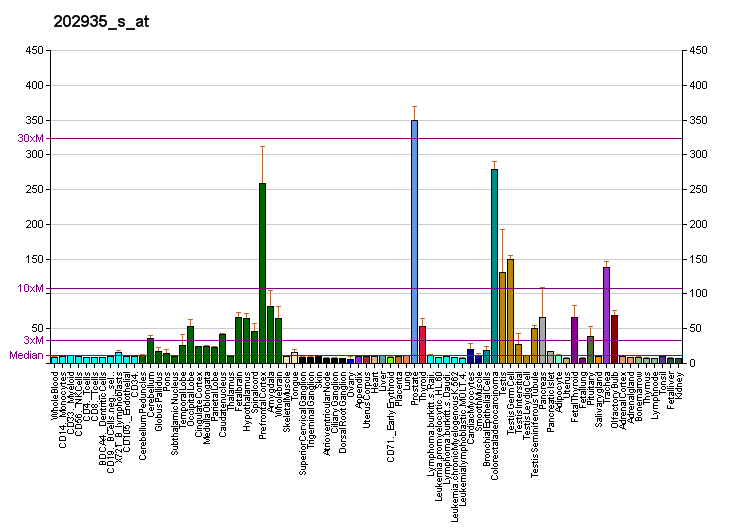

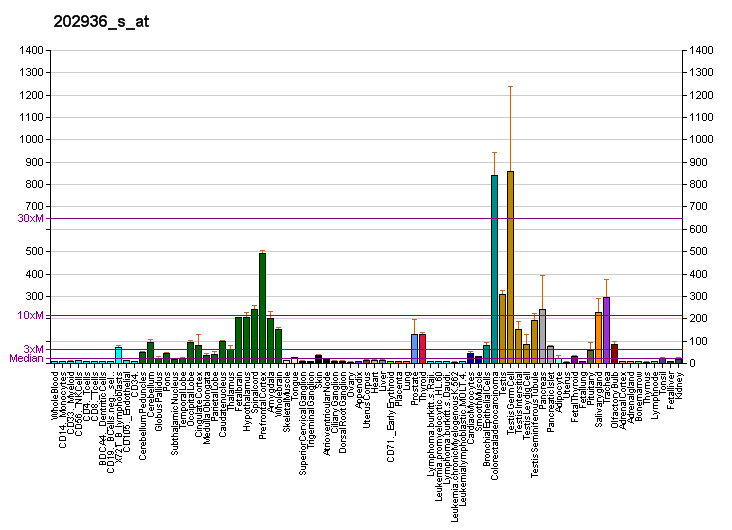
RNA expression pattern
Bgee	Human / Mouse (ortholog); Top expressed in: ventricular zone; hair follicle; optic nerve; parotid gland; retinal pigment epithelium; internal globus pallidus; lactiferous duct; buccal mucosa cell; cartilage tissue; pylorus / Top expressed in: digit; cartilage organ; sphenoid bone; toe; basisphenoid; lacrimal gland; main bronchus; second toe; epithelium of seminiferous tubule of testis; cervical loop; More reference expression data
BioGPS	More reference expression data
Gene ontology
Molecular function	DNA-binding transcription factor activity; DNA-binding transcription activator activity, RNA polymerase II-specific; core promoter sequence-specific DNA binding; protein kinase activity; protein kinase A catalytic subunit binding; beta-catenin binding; pre-mRNA intronic binding; chromatin binding; protein binding; DNA binding; sequence-specific DNA binding; transcription cis-regulatory region binding; bHLH transcription factor binding; cis-regulatory region sequence-specific DNA binding; protein heterodimerization activity; transcription factor activity, RNA polymerase II distal enhancer sequence-specific binding; DNA-binding transcription factor activity, RNA polymerase II-specific; RNA polymerase II cis-regulatory region sequence-specific DNA binding
Cellular component	nucleus; transcription regulator complex; nucleoplasm; protein-containing complex
Biological process	skeletal system development; cellular response to retinoic acid; bronchus cartilage development; positive regulation of protein phosphorylation; heart valve development; limb bud formation; positive regulation of protein catabolic process; regulation of transcription by RNA polymerase II; ureter morphogenesis; negative regulation of immune system process; chondrocyte development; positive regulation of cell proliferation involved in heart morphogenesis; oligodendrocyte differentiation; chondrocyte hypertrophy; prostate gland development; lung smooth muscle development; mammary gland development; negative regulation of ossification; negative regulation of photoreceptor cell differentiation; cellular response to mechanical stimulus; intrahepatic bile duct development; regulation of cell adhesion; negative regulation of chondrocyte differentiation; positive regulation of mesenchymal cell proliferation; astrocyte fate commitment; positive regulation of chondrocyte differentiation; spermatogenesis; prostate gland morphogenesis; negative regulation of epithelial cell proliferation; lung epithelial cell differentiation; chondrocyte differentiation involved in endochondral bone morphogenesis; negative regulation of canonical Wnt signaling pathway; endocrine pancreas development; negative regulation of cell population proliferation; regulation of apoptotic process; cellular response to transforming growth factor beta stimulus; negative regulation of mesenchymal cell apoptotic process; chromatin remodeling; negative regulation of myoblast differentiation; positive regulation of branching involved in ureteric bud morphogenesis; cell fate commitment; regulation of transcription, DNA-templated; epidermal growth factor receptor signaling pathway; ossification; regulation of cell proliferation involved in tissue homeostasis; ureter smooth muscle cell differentiation; ERK1 and ERK2 cascade; notochord development; positive regulation of epithelial cell migration; Sertoli cell differentiation; male sex determination; negative regulation of gene expression; transcription, DNA-templated; metanephric nephron tubule formation; positive regulation of transcription, DNA-templated; development of the heart; regulation of branching involved in lung morphogenesis; ureter urothelium development; branching involved in ureteric bud morphogenesis; cartilage development; Harderian gland development; positive regulation of kidney development; central nervous system development; heart valve formation; positive regulation of cartilage development; tissue homeostasis; metanephric tubule development; negative regulation of biomineral tissue development; endochondral bone morphogenesis; trachea cartilage development; male germ-line sex determination; lacrimal gland development; Notch signaling pathway; hair follicle development; cell differentiation; ureter development; regulation of cell cycle process; male gonad development; positive regulation of epithelial cell proliferation; cell fate specification; intestinal epithelial structure maintenance; positive regulation of extracellular matrix assembly; extracellular matrix organization; negative regulation of apoptotic process; negative regulation of transcription by RNA polymerase II; Sertoli cell development; positive regulation of mesenchymal stem cell differentiation; retina development in camera-type eye; cellular response to interleukin-1; epithelial to mesenchymal transition; homeostasis of number of cells within a tissue; negative regulation of transcription, DNA-templated; cAMP-mediated signaling; cartilage condensation; positive regulation of male gonad development; nucleosome assembly; negative regulation of bone mineralization; morphogenesis of a branching epithelium; neural crest cell development; protein kinase B signaling; somatic stem cell population maintenance; otic vesicle formation; otic vesicle development; endocardial cushion morphogenesis; cellular response to epidermal growth factor stimulus; positive regulation of epithelial cell differentiation; renal vesicle induction; positive regulation of gene expression; regulation of epithelial cell proliferation involved in lung morphogenesis; regulation of cell population proliferation; heart valve morphogenesis; cytoskeleton organization; cochlea morphogenesis; positive regulation of cell population proliferation; epithelial cell proliferation involved in prostatic bud elongation; retinal rod cell differentiation; protein localization to nucleus; regulation of cell differentiation; positive regulation of phosphatidylinositol 3-kinase signaling; cellular response to heparin; negative regulation of epithelial cell differentiation; epithelial tube branching involved in lung morphogenesis; signal transduction; positive regulation of transcription by RNA polymerase II; negative regulation of pri-miRNA transcription by RNA polymerase II; chondrocyte differentiation; neural crest cell fate specification; cellular response to BMP stimulus; cell-cell adhesion; transcription initiation from RNA polymerase II promoter; protein-containing complex assembly; anterior head development; morphogenesis of an epithelium; aortic valve morphogenesis; regulation of gene expression
Sources:Amigo / QuickGO
Orthologs
Databases	NCBI: entry; OMA: entry
Species	Human	Mouse
Entrez	6662	20682
Ensembl	ENSG00000125398	ENSMUSG00000000567
UniProt	P48436	Q04887
RefSeq (mRNA)	NM_000346	NM_011448
RefSeq (protein)	NP_000337	NP_035578
Location (UCSC)	Chr 17: 72.12 – 72.13 Mb	Chr 11: 112.67 – 112.68 Mb
PubMed search
- Wikidata
View/Edit Human	View/Edit Mouse

Transcription factor SOX-9 is a protein that in humans is encoded by the SOX9 gene.

== Function ==
SOX-9 recognizes the sequence CCTTGAG along with other members of the HMG-box class DNA-binding proteins. It is expressed by proliferating but not hypertrophic chondrocytes that is essential for differentiation of precursor cells into chondrocytes and, with steroidogenic factor 1, regulates transcription of the anti-Müllerian hormone (AMH) gene.

SOX-9 also plays a pivotal role in male sexual development; by working with Sf1, SOX-9 can produce AMH in Sertoli cells to inhibit the creation of a female reproductive system. It also interacts with a few other genes to promote the development of male sexual organs. The process starts when the transcription factor testis determining factor (encoded by the sex-determining region SRY of the Y chromosome) activates SOX-9 activity by binding to an enhancer sequence upstream of the gene. Next, SOX9 activates FGF9 and forms feedforward loops with FGF9 and PGD2. These loops are important for producing SOX-9; without these loops, SOX-9 would run out and the development of a female would almost certainly ensue. Activation of FGF9 by SOX-9 starts vital processes in male development, such as the creation of testis cords and the multiplication of Sertoli cells. The association of SOX-9 and Dax1 actually creates Sertoli cells, another vital process in male development. In the brain development, its murine ortholog Sox-9 induces the expression of Wwp1, Wwp2, and miR-140 to regulate cortical plate entry of newly born nerve cells, and regulate axon branching and axon formation in cortical neurons.

Sox9, also known as SRY-Box Transcription Factor 9, is an important gene in sex determination. The SOX family of genes are all transcription factors for the Y chromosomal sex-determining factor SRY. The SRY gene encodes the SOX transcription factor while it upregulates Sox9. Sox9 then activates Fgf9, Fibroblast growth factor 9, which is another integral transcription factor in the formation of the male gonads. Fgf9 up-regulates Sox9 in a positive feedforward cascade, this causes the differentiation of sertoli cells leading to the formation of the testis.

SOX-9 is a target of the Notch signaling pathway, as well as the Hedgehog pathway, and plays a role in the regulation of neural stem cell fate. In vivo and in vitro studies show that SOX-9 negatively regulates neurogenesis and positively regulates gliogenesis and stem cell survival.

In adult articular chondrocytes, siRNA-mediated knockdown of SOX-9 or RTL3 results in the downregulation of the other and reduced type II collagen (COL2A1) mRNA and protein expression.

Overexpression of SOX9 in the XY gonads can be used in the absence of SRY to further male sex determination and testis development. It can also be found that the expression of SOX9 ectopically in the XX gonads results in the development of testis, even in the absence of SRY. Both demonstrate that SOX9, in the absence of SRY for the XX and XY gonads, will continue to play a crucial role in testis development, testis differentiation, and sex determination. It is also elaborated that SOX9 can be substituted for SRY.

== Clinical significance ==
Mutations lead to the skeletal malformation syndrome campomelic dysplasia, frequently with autosomal sex-reversal and cleft palate.

SOX9 sits in a gene desert on 17q24 in humans. Deletions, disruptions by translocation breakpoints and a single point mutation of highly conserved non-coding elements located > 1 Mb from the transcription unit on either side of SOX9 have been associated with Pierre Robin Sequence, often with a cleft palate.

The SOX9 protein has been implicated in both initiation and progression of multiple solid tumors. Its role as a master regulator of morphogenesis during human development makes it an ideal candidate for perturbation in malignant tissues. Specifically, SOX9 appears to induce invasiveness and therapy-resistance in prostate, colorectal, breast and other cancers, and therefore promotes lethal metastasis. Many of these oncogenic effects of SOX9 appear dose-dependent.

== SOX9 localization and dynamics ==
SOX9 is mostly localized in the nucleus and it is highly mobile. Studies in chondrocyte cell line has revealed nearly 50% of SOX9 is bound to DNA and it is directly regulated by external factors. Its half-time of residence on DNA is ~14 seconds.

== Role in sexual differentiation ==
SOX9 helps channel SRY activation in sexual differentiation. Mutations in SOX9 or any associated genes can cause a reversal of sex. If FGF9, which is activated by SOX9, is not present, a fetus with both X and Y chromosomes will become female. the same is true if DAX1 is not present. The related phenomena can be caused by unusual activity of the SRY in XX male syndrome, usually when it's translocated onto the X-chromosome and its activity is only activated in some cells. Mutation or deletion of SOX9 could cause an XY fetus to be female because SOX9 is a critical effector gene that works because of the SRY gene to differentiate Sertoli cells and drive testis formation in males.

== Interactions ==
SOX9 has been shown to interact with steroidogenic factor 1, MED12, MAF, SWI/SNF, MLL3 and MLL4.

== Knock out models ==
Loss of function mutations with Sox9 can lead to campomelic dysplasia (CD), due to mutations affecting protein functions and translocations that disrupt gene expression. There have been Sox9 knockout mice that have shown improved stroke recovery, especially when inhibiting inhibitors of axonal sprouting such as NOGO and chondroitin sulfate proteoglycans (CSPGs). Sox9 ablation leads to decreased levels of CSPG, which increases tissue sparing and improved post-stroke neurological recovery. These Sox9 knockout mice promote reparative axonal sprouting, neuroprotection and recovery after stroke.

== See also ==
- SOX genes
