= Milislav Demerec =

Croatian-American geneticist (1895–1966)

- Born: January 11, 1895; Kostajnica, Kingdom of Croatia-Slavonia, Austria-Hungary
- Died: April 12, 1966 (aged 71)
- Education: College of Agriculture, Križevci, Croatia; College of Agriculture, Grignon, France; Cornell University (Ph.D. 1923)
- Known for: Genetics of the plant Delphinium and the fruit fly Drosophila virilis
- Scientific career
- Fields: Genetics
- Workplaces: Križevci Experiment Station; Carnegie Institution of Washington; Brookhaven National Laboratory; Long Island University
- Doctoral advisor: Rollins A. Emerson
- Other academic advisors: C. W. Metz

Milislav Demerec (January 11, 1895 – April 12, 1966) was a Croatian-American geneticist, and the director of the Department of Genetics, Carnegie Institution of Washington (CIW), now Cold Spring Harbor Laboratory (CSHL) from 1941 to 1960, recruiting Barbara McClintock and Alfred Hershey.

Demerec was born and raised in Kostajnica. He attended College of Agriculture in Križevci, graduating in 1916. He worked at Krizevci Experiment Station, and then attended the College of Agriculture in Grignon, France after World War I. He emigrated to the United States for graduate studies in 1919.

In 1919 he started his PhD at Cornell University, his work was on maize genetics and was supervised by Rollins A. Emerson. He completed his PhD in 1923 and took up a research position at the Carnegie Institution of Washington's Department of Genetics, now Cold Spring Harbor Laboratory. He completed work from his PhD, showing that ten different alleles could cause albinism in maize kernels, then on the advice of C. W. Metz he began work on the genetics of the plant Delphinium and the fruit fly Drosophila virilis studying mosaicism.

He became a prominent Drosophila researcher and established the Drosophila Information Service newsletter in 1934 with Calvin Bridges. In 1936 he was made the assistant directory of the Department of Genetics, and the acting director in 1941 following the retirement of Albert Blakeslee. That year, he was also made director of the Biological Laboratory of the Long Island Biological Association making him the director of both Cold Spring Harbor laboratories, by 1943.

After overcoming opposition from Thomas Hunt Morgan, Demerec oversaw the completion of much of the late Calvin Bridges’s work. Demerec appointed Katherine Brehme Warren to complete The Mutants of Drosophila melanogaster (1944) and the book became a classic in the field.

In the 1940s the direction of Demerec's research changed to the genetics of bacteria and their viruses after a symposium given by Max Delbrück. During World War II he used his knowledge of bacterial genetics to increase the yield from the Penicillium. Following the war he continued to work on bacterial genetics and the problem of antibiotic resistance in E. coli, Salmonella, and Staphylococcus. In 1946 he was elected to the National Academy of Sciences, and in 1947 became the founding editor of Advances in Genetics, the first journal to review the finding of modern genetics. In the 1950s he served on the genetics panel of the National Academy of Sciences' Committee on the Biological Effects of Atomic Radiation. In 1952 he was elected to the American Philosophical Society.

Following his retirement from CSHL, he took a position at the Brookhaven National Laboratory, working there until 1965. In 1966 he served briefly as research professor at Long Island University, until he died on April 12, 1966.
