= Thomas Hunt Morgan bibliography =

This is a list of books and monographs by the American geneticist Thomas Hunt Morgan. Morgan produced 22 books on embryology, genetics and evolution. Books are in order by date. Three of Morgan's co-authors have their own articles: Calvin Bridges, Alfred Sturtevant and Hermann Joseph Muller.

- The Development of the Frog's Egg: An Introduction to Experimental Embryology, New York: Macmillan, 1897. Full text online at . Translated into German by Bernhard Solger and published in 1904 as Die Entwicklung des Froscheies..
- Regeneration Columbia University Biological Series, New York: Macmillan, 1901. Full text online at .
- Evolution and Adaptation, New York: Macmillan, 1903. Full text online at .
- Experimental Zoology, New York: Macmillan, 1907
- Heredity and Sex, New York: Columbia University Press, 1913. Full text online at .
- The Mechanism of Mendelian Heredity, with A.H. Sturtevant, H.J. Muller and C.B. Bridges, New York:Henry Holt, 1915. Revised and re-issued in 1922. Full text online at .
- A Critique of the Theory of Evolution, Princeton NJ: Princeton University Press, 1916. Full text online at .
- Sex-linked Inheritance in Drosophila, with C.B. Bridges, Washington DC: Carnegie Institution, 1916. Full text online at .
- The Genetic and the Operative Evidence of Relating to Secondary Sexual Characteristics, Washington DC: Carnegie Institution, 1919
- The Physical Basis of Heredity, Monographs on Experimental Biology, Philadelphia: J.B. Lippincott, 1919. Full text online at .
- Contributions to the Genetics of Drosophila Melanogaster, with A.H.Sturtevant and C.B.Bridges: Carnegie Institution of Washington, 1919.
- Some Possible Bearings of Genetics on Pathology, Lancaster PA: New Era Printing Co., 1922
- The Third-Chromosome Group of Mutant Characters of Drosophila melanogaster, with C.B. Bridges, Washington DC: Carnegie Institution, 1923
- Laboratory Directions for and Elementary Course in Genetics, with H.J. Muller, A.H. Sturtevant and C.B. Bridges, New York: Henry Holt, 1923
- Human Inheritance, Pittsburgh:University of Pittsburgh School of Medicine, 1924
- Evolution and Genetics, Princeton NJ: Princeton University Press, 1925
- The Theory of the Gene, New Haven: Yale University Press, 1926
- Genetics and the Physiology of Development, Woods Hole: Marine Biological Laboratory, 1926
- Experimental Embryology, New York: Columbia University Press, 1927
- What is Darwinism?, New York: W.H. Norton, 1929
- The Scientific Basis of Evolution, New York: W.H. Norton, 1932
- Embryology and Genetics, New York: Columbia University Press, 1934

== See also ==
- List of publications in science
