= Alice Middleton Boring =

American biologist, zoologist, and herpetologist

- Boring c. 1927
- Born: February 22, 1883; Philadelphia, Pennsylvania, US
- Died: September 18, 1955 (aged 72); Cambridge, Massachusetts, US
- Education: Bryn Mawr
- Scientific career
- Fields: Biology, zoology, herpetology
- Thesis: A Study of the Spermatogenesis of Twenty-two Species of the Membracidae, Jassidae, Cercopidae and Fulgoridae
- Doctoral advisor: Nettie M. Stevens

Alice Middleton Boring (simplified Chinese: 博爱理; traditional Chinese: 博愛理; pinyin: bó àilǐ, February 22, 1883 – September 18, 1955) was an American biologist, zoologist, and herpetologist, who taught biology and did research in the United States and China.

== Early life and education ==
Alice Middleton Boring was born in 1883 in Philadelphia. Her family originally settled in the Americas in the 17th century. Her relatives were involved in the Moravian Church, which would greatly influence Alice's upbringing. Boring attended the Friends' Central School, a coeducational school where she excelled in the sciences.

After graduation Boring enrolled at Bryn Mawr College, where her sister had graduated in 1896. Bryn Mawr who was part of the Seven Sisters (colleges) and a was founded by Quakers, further spurred her interest in applying there. She started her freshman year in 1900. She studied under the geneticist Nettie Stevens, and evolutionary biologist Thomas Hunt Morgan. Morgan and Boring would co-write an article on frog embryos. In 1904 Boring would publish her first academic work entitled, "Closure of Longitudinally Split Tubularian Stems." Boring continued her educational journey at Bryn Mawr College where she would receive her master's degree and her PhD. Boring continued to work with Stevens throughout her graduate studies where they both focused on the study of Flatworms. Boring attended University of Pennsylvania for less than a year where she studied under Edwin Conklin, however she decided to continue her studies at Bryn Mawr after Conklin left. Before her graduation from Bryn Mawr College, Boring taught biology for a year at Vassar College. In 1907 Boring attended University of Würzburg and Naples Zoological Station. While in Europe Boring would study under Theodor Boveri and Anton Dohrn. After studying in Italy and Germany, Boring graduated from Bryn Mawr College in 1910. She taught at University of Maine as an instructor for 1911, an assistant professor from 1911 to 1913 and then as an associate professor from 1913 to 1918. While at University of Maine, Boring collaborated and worked with Raymond Pearl, and co-authored numerous papers with him, including a paper on Ascaris. She also collaborated with Pearl and co-author papers on fowl. Boring was a supporter of Women's suffrage.

In 1918, she was appointed an assistant professor of biology at Peking Union Medical College; her appointment came from the Rockefeller Foundation. Boring taught at Peking Union Medical College for two years before returning to teach zoology at Wellesley College. Disappointed after returning to the United States, Boring worked hard to return to China. Through Wellesley she accepted a two-year teaching post at Peking University, which would later be known as Yenching University. After her initial two years were up she stayed at the university. Boring took furlough from 1928 to 1929, and returned home during a rise of nationalist tensions in China. During this year of furlough she continued her research at the University of Pennsylvania, where she worked and consulted with Clifford H. Pope and G.K. Noble. In 1930, she became the acting dean of the College of Natural Sciences. Between 1930 and 1950, Boring published 21 papers in Peking Natural History Bulletin. Boring taught a plethora of students who went on to have prestigious careers, including Wu Jieping, Tang Xi Xue, Laurence T. Wu, and Frederick F. Kao. While in China, Boring worked with biologist Nathaniel Gist Gee, and embarked on many expeditions to Jiangxi, Zhejiang, and Anhui to conduct research by collecting specimens.

Boring's work was interrupted during the Second Sino-Japanese War. Despite the occupation of Beijing by the Japanese, Boring continued to teach. She also continued to publish research with Pope and continued to work on the taxonomy of Chinese amphibians. She specifically studied Bufo bufo and Rana nigromaculata, which led her to publish numerous journal articles. After Pearl Harbor things drastically changed for Boring. She was forced to move to a compound foreign faculty. In March 1942, she and her foreign faculty were forced to leave the university. On March 25, Boring boarded Japanese trucks that took her and other foreigners to the Weihsien Civilian Assembly Center. On August 24, Boring was repatriated back to the United States.

Boring taught histology at Columbia University College of Physicians and Surgeon until June 1945. She then taught as a visiting professor at Mount Holyoke College as a visiting professor of zoology. Boring returned to Yenching University in 1946 when it was safe for foreigners to return. However she found herself in the middle of the Chinese Civil War. In 1950 Boring left China for the last time. She returned to the United States, and began taking care of her ill sister. In 1951–1953, Boring taught at Smith College. She returned the following year and work with numerous charities including League of Women Voters, American Friends Service Committee, The Cambridge Civic Association, and American Civil Liberties Union. She was diagnosed with cerebral arteriovenous malformation. She died on September 18, 1955, from a suspected cerebral thrombosis.

== Taxon named in her honor ==
- Diaphus aliciae is a species of lanternfish found in the Indo-Pacific.

== Bibliography ==
- Handbook of North China Amphibians and Reptiles (1932) with Ch'eng-chao Liu and Shu-ch’un Chou
- Survey of Chinese Amphibia (1940) with Clifford Hillhouse Pope
- Chinese Amphibians: Living and Fossil Forms (1945)
