= Brehme =

Brehme may refer to:

== People with the surname ==
- Albert Brehme (born 1903), German bobsledder
- Andreas Brehme (1960–2024), German football player and coach
- Anton Brehme (born 1999), German volleyball player
- Bernd Brehme (born 1938), German football coach
- Christian Brehme (1613–1667), German poet, librarian and mayor
- Gerhard Brehme (1912–1943), German Wehrmacht officer and Knight's Cross of the Iron Cross recipient
- Hans Brehme (1904–1957), German composer
- Hugo Brehme (1882–1954), German-born photographer of Mexico
- Karl Brehme (1858–1925), Saxon major general
- Matthias Brehme (born 1943), German gymnast
- Richard Brehme (1826–1887), German doctor
- Stephanie Brehme (born 1970), German actress

== Places ==
- Brehme, Germany, a municipality in Eichsfeld district, Thuringia, Germany

== See also ==
- Katherine Brehme Warren (1909–1991), American geneticist and scientific editor
