= Walter Sutton =

American geneticist (1877–1916)

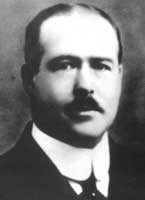
- Born: April 5, 1877; Utica, New York
- Died: November 10, 1916 (aged 39); Kansas City, Kansas
- Education: University of Kansas; Columbia University
- Known for: Boveri–Sutton chromosome theory Surgical improvements
- Scientific career
- Fields: Genetics, medicine
- Doctoral advisor: Edmund B. Wilson
- Other academic advisors: C. E. McClung

Walter Stanborough Sutton (April 5, 1877 – November 10, 1916) was an American geneticist and biologist whose most significant contribution to present-day biology was his theory that the Mendelian laws of inheritance could be applied to chromosomes at the cellular level of living organisms. This is now known as the Boveri–Sutton chromosome theory.

== Early life ==
Sutton was born in Utica, New York, and was raised on a farm as the fifth of seven sons to Judge William B. Sutton and his wife, Agnes Black Sutton, in Russell, Kansas. On the farm, he developed a mechanical aptitude by maintaining and repairing farm equipment, an aptitude that proved helpful later as he worked on oil drilling rigs and with medical instrumentation.

== University of Kansas ==
After graduating high school in Russell, he enrolled at the University of Kansas in engineering in 1896. Following the death of his younger brother (John) from typhoid fever in 1897, Sutton switched his major to biology with an interest in medicine. While at the University of Kansas, both he and his older brother, William Sutton, played basketball for Dr. James Naismith. Sutton distinguished himself as a student by being elected to both Phi Beta Kappa and Sigma Xi and receiving both bachelor's and master's degrees by 1901. For his Masters thesis, he studied the spermatogenesis of Brachystola magna, a large grasshopper indigenous to the farmlands upon which Sutton was raised.

== Columbia University ==
Considering the advice of his mentor at KU, Dr. C. E. McClung, Sutton moved to Columbia University for further study of zoology under Dr. Edmund B. Wilson. It was here that Sutton wrote his two significant works in genetics – "On the morphology of the chromosome group in Brachystola magna" and "The chromosomes in heredity". Effectively, Sutton could now explain "why the yellow dog is yellow".

The German biologist Theodor Boveri independently reached the same conclusions as Sutton, and their concepts are often referred to as the Boveri–Sutton chromosome theory. Sutton's hypothesis was widely accepted by most scientists, particularly cytologists, at the time. The continued work of Thomas Hunt Morgan at Columbia brought the theory to universal acceptance by 1915 through his studies of Drosophila melanogaster, the fruit fly, even as William Bateson continued to question the theory until 1921.

Sutton did not complete his PhD in Zoology as he originally planned. At the age of 26, he returned to the Kansas oil fields for 2 years. There he was able to perfect a device to start large gas engines with high pressure-gas and develop hoisting apparatuses for deep wells. Sutton's mechanical aptitudes never left him. His father finally directed him to return to his medical studies and he did so returning to Columbia University in 1905.

Sutton's medical studies proceeded through the College of Physicians and Surgeons at Columbia University. While he continued to work on patents associated with oil drilling, Sutton also began at this stage to apply his mechanical aptitude to improving medical instruments. With credit for his graduate studies at both the University of Kansas and Columbia University, Sutton obtained his doctorate in medicine in 1907 graduating with "high standing". He then began an internship at Roosevelt Hospital in New York working in the surgical division headed by Dr. Joseph Blake.

== Career ==
In addition to his clinic duties at Roosevelt Hospital, Sutton was also able to work with the Surgical Research Laboratory at the College of Physicians and Surgeons. With that support, he was able to begin developing and improving a variety of medical and surgical practices including improving anesthetic techniques, and perfecting abdominal irrigation.

In 1909, Sutton returned to Kansas City, Kansas where his family had relocated and his father and brother were in law practice. Sutton was appointed assistant professor of surgery at the four-year-old University of Kansas Medical School. The tenuous nature of the appointment at the young school led him to also maintain a private practice and serve on the staff of St. Margaret's Hospital as well as the university's Bell Memorial Hospital. For six years, Sutton performed a wide range of surgeries carefully documenting the procedures. He published several articles related to these cases going back to his internship at Roosevelt.

In 1911, he had accepted a commission as a First Lieutenant in the United States Army Medical reserve Corps. This eventually led to his taking a leave of absence from the university in February 1915 to serve at the American Ambulance Hospital outside Paris. Sutton and others from his days at Columbia and Roosevelt arrived at College of Juilly on February 23 where hospital facilities had been set up only 40 miles from the front lines of World War I. Within 2 months, he was surgeon-in-chief handling administrative duties in addition to his surgical responsibilities. His inventive aptitude was perhaps never more valued as he developed fluoroscopic techniques to identify and localize shrapnel within the soldier's bodies and then removed the foreign items with instruments of his own design. After his return, he documented these techniques in Binnie's Manual of Operative Surgery. Sutton's return sailing from France was on June 26, 1915, having stayed only four months, but have made a significant contribution to wartime medical treatment.

Dr. Sutton died rather unexpectedly at the age of 39 due to complications from acute appendicitis.
