= Diaphus aliciae =

Conservation status
- Least Concern (IUCN 3.1)

Scientific classification
- Kingdom: Animalia
- Phylum: Chordata
- Class: Actinopterygii
- Order: Myctophiformes
- Family: Myctophidae
- Genus: Diaphus
- Species: D. aliciae

Binomial name
- Diaphus aliciae Fowler, 1934

Species of fish

Diaphus aliciae is a species of lanternfish found in the Indo-Pacific and the South China Sea.

== Description ==
This species reaches a length of 6.0 cm (2.4 in).

== Etymology ==
The fish is named in honor of American herpetologist Alice Boring (1883–1955), of Yenching University, Beijing, China.
