= Mildred Hoge Richards =

American geneticist and zoologist

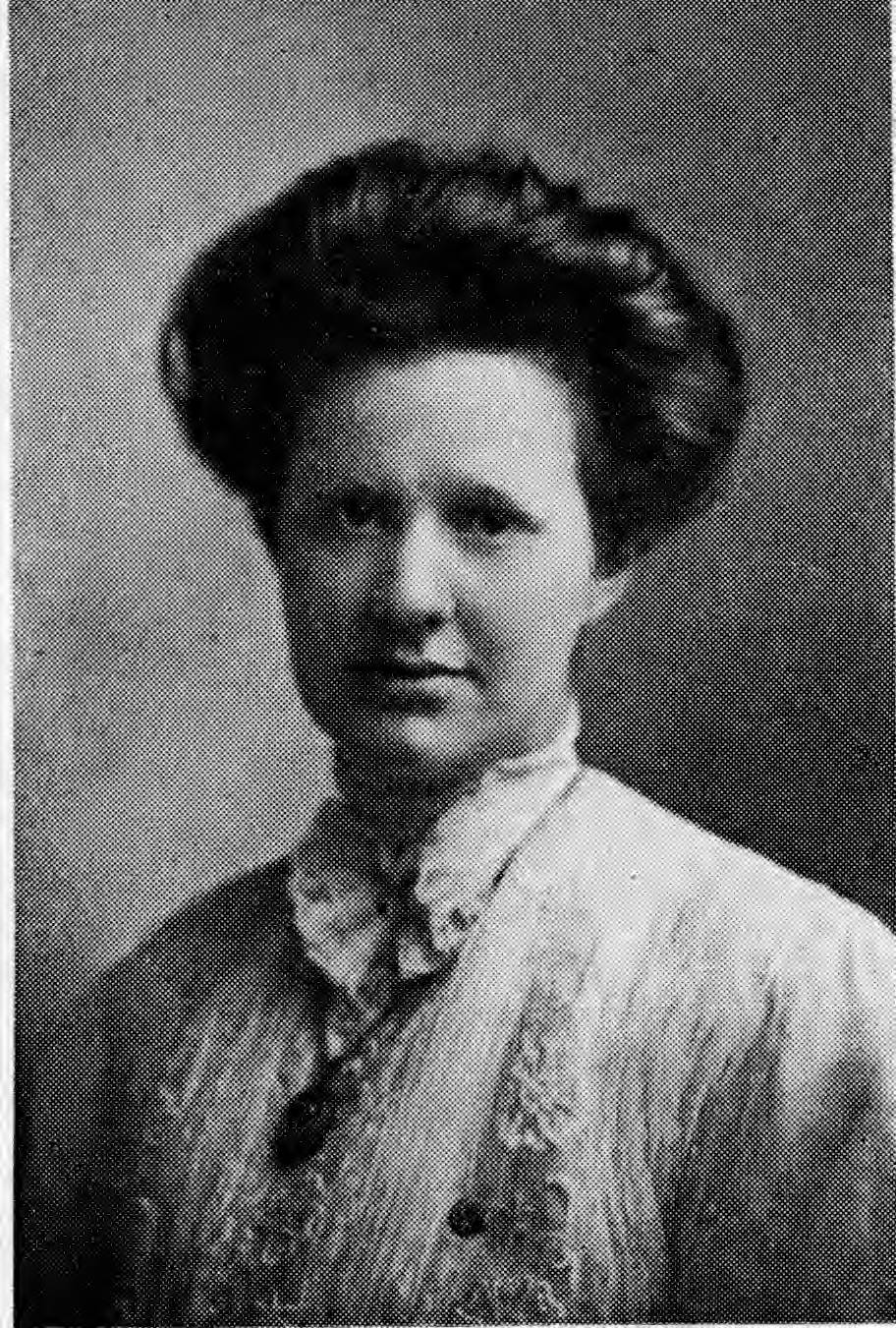
Mildred Hoge in 1908

Mildred Albro Hoge Richards (July 7, 1885 – September 6, 1968) was an American geneticist and zoologist who discovered, among other things, the gene responsible for development of the eye.

== Early life and education ==
Mildred Hoge was born in Baltimore, Maryland, the daughter of James Thornton and Fanny Stead Hoge. Her brother, Joseph Franklin Dix Hoge, was four years older. Later in her life, in the 1950s, Hoge compiled genealogies of a couple branches of her family, focusing on the descendants of Samuel Hogg of Wilmington, Delaware, and the Kunkel family, of Frederick, Maryland.

Hoge's education included an A.B. in zoology from Goucher College in 1908, and an M.A. from Columbia University in 1912. In that year, Hoge published perhaps her first academic paper examining punishment and reward as motivators in animal models.

== Career ==
As World War I was getting under way, Hoge discovered a fly gene, which she called "eyeless", because a mutation in the gene resulted in the dramatic loss of eyes. In her paper announcing the discovery of eyeless, she managed to breed the fragile and short-lived mutant flies, quantified and characterized crosses of eyeless with other known mutants, and determined from those interactions that the eyeless gene was located on the 4th of four fly chromosomes.

She was trained by the Nobel-prize winning geneticist Thomas Hunt Morgan and received her Ph.D. in genetics from Columbia University in 1914. A couple of her genetics papers including the one on the eyeless gene were referenced in Morgan's seminal book The Mechanism of Mendelian Heredity. The other paper by her that Morgan referenced examined the effects of temperature on Mendelian trait development.

Morgan and his students, like Hoge, used the common fruit fly (Drosophila melanogaster) to study how genes influenced observable physical traits. The work they did in the early 1900s established the fruit fly as a powerful model organism for genetic studies. In the century after Morgan's Fly Room was established at Columbia, fly genetics research has yielded numerous discoveries of basic biological mechanisms operating in species as diverse as single-celled yeast to humans. One example is the critical regulatory gene for the development of eyes in everything from simple marine worms to humans, which today we know as the transcription factor gene PAX6, discovered by Hoge.

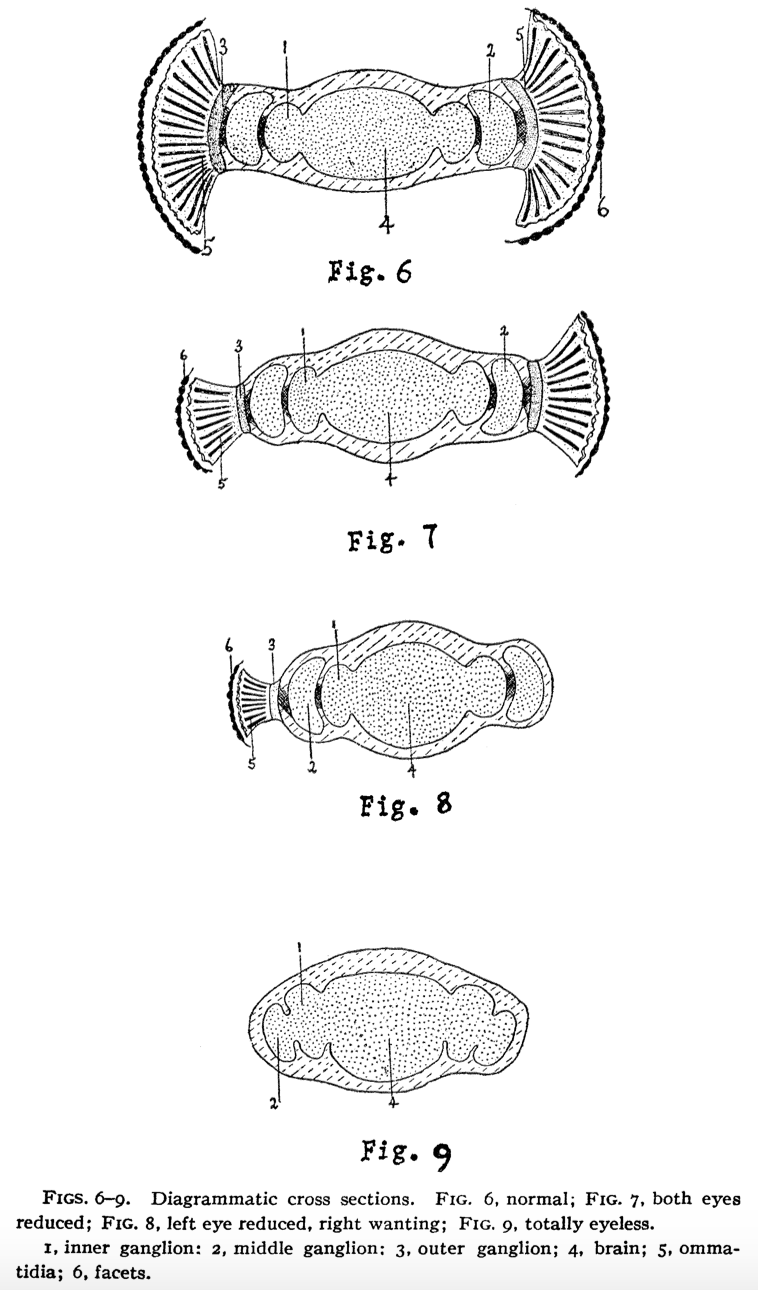
Dissection of Drosophila melanogaster heads with or without eyeless mutation

Soon after receiving her Ph.D., Hoge worked as an instructor in zoology at Indiana University from 1914 to 1918, while her future husband taught at the University of Texas, Austin, and Wabash College in Indiana during this period.

Hoge continued publishing on the genetics of the fly eye including a paper discussing genes on the 3rd chromosome that had an effect on eye color.

Hoge had married Aute Richards in 1917, and in 1920 he moved to the University of Oklahoma, where he became professor and head of the department of zoology and held various other positions until he retired in 1950. They remained in Oklahoma through the depths of the Great Depression, and one of the Public Works Administration projects started in 1934 was the construction of a new Biological Sciences building which was named Richards Hall in his honor. She was unable to work at the University of Oklahoma, presumably because of nepotism rules, and was only able to secure an assistant professorship for a year before she retired in 1948.

Hoge Richards remained active in genetics despite the career limitations in Oklahoma. In 1925 she published a paper on the anatomy of the fly eye with and without the mutation she discovered in 1914. This paper showcased her very fine dissections of the fly head and revealed the extent to which the eye and adjacent neural structures were disrupted by mutations in the eyeless gene. This work established the physical scope of the eyeless gene and its role in development of various eye structures.

In 1933, Hoge published a paper examining the heritability of allergies, which at the time was associated with migraines.

== Personal life and retirement ==
Hoge married Aute Richards on December 19, 1917. They had two sons. After Aute's retirement from the University of Oklahoma, the couple moved to Tucson, Arizona, where they lived out their lives. She died on September 6, 1968, in Tucson. (Note: There is a discrepancy in the year of death. The Geni.com website states Hoge Richards died in 1968. The Memoriam for Aute Richards says that Mildred passed away in 1967. The Arizona death certificate states that she died on September 6, 1968.)
