= Harold Henry Plough =

American biologist (1892–1985)

Harold Henry Plough (April 5, 1892 – November 12, 1985) was an American biologist and a professor at Amherst College. He worked on a range of topics including genetics, examining mutations and marine organisms. He was a student of T. H. Morgan.

Plough was born in New York city and went to Amherst College and on graduating he went to Columbia University in 1913. He received an MA in 1915 and a PhD two years later with a thesis on The effect of temperature on crossing-over in Drosophila. He joined the biology department of Amherst College, rose to the position of professor and worked there until his retirement. He was involved in recruiting H. J. Muller to Amherst College in 1940. Muller was considered as an "undesirable communist sympathizer" and he left Amherst College in 1945, a year before he received a Nobel Prize. Plough worked on the genetics of Drosophila at T. H. Morgan's laboratory in the Marine Biological Laboratory, Woods Hole. He studied radiation and heat induced mutations and was a member of the United States Atomic Energy Commission (1951-53). He had an interest in the Ascidians and after retirement, he published a book on the Sea Squirts of the Atlantic Continental Shelf in 1976.
