= Nettie Stevens =

American geneticist (1861–1912)

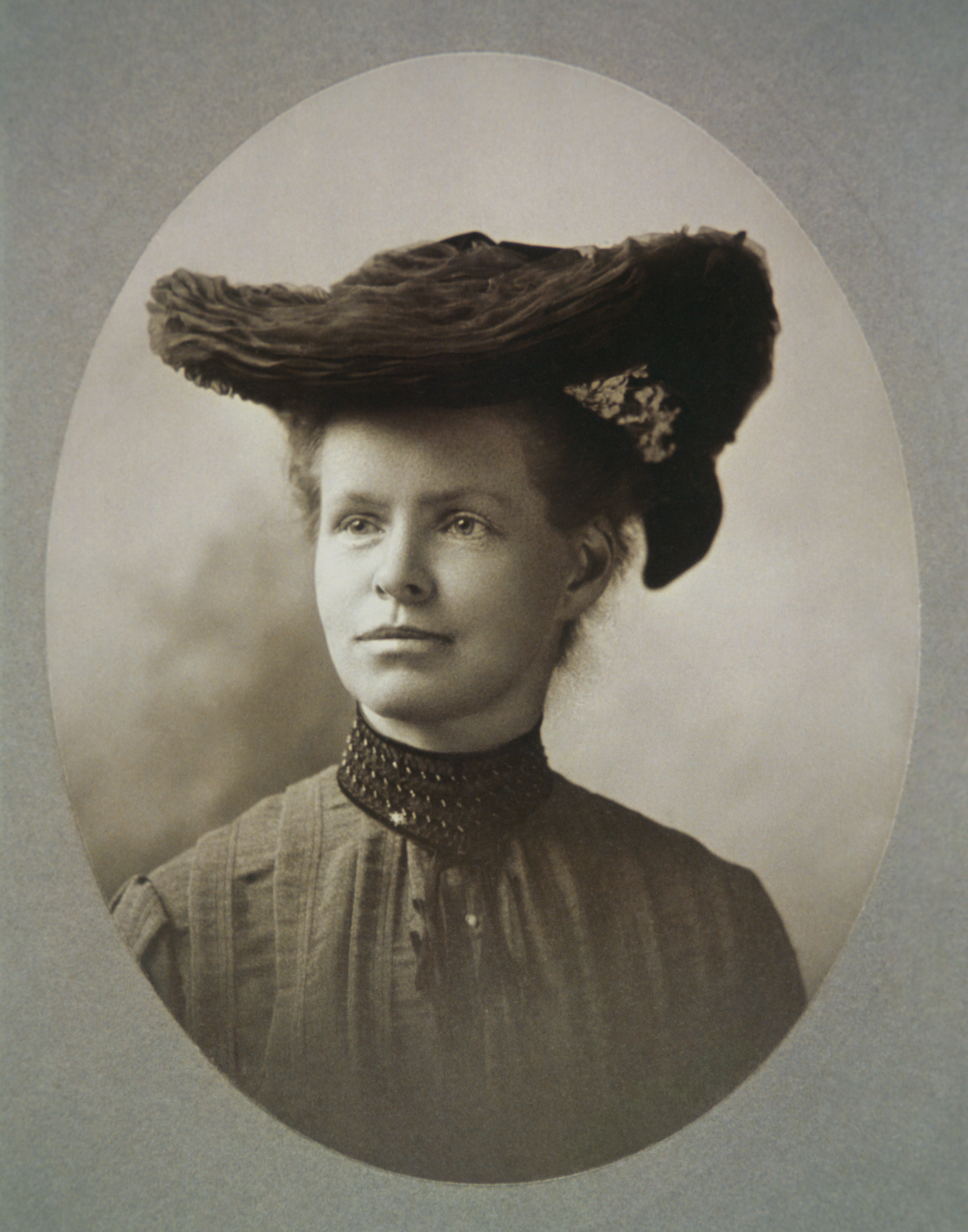
- Stevens, c. 1904
- Born: Nettie Maria Stevens; July 7, 1861; Cavendish, Vermont, United States
- Died: May 4, 1912 (aged 50); Baltimore, Maryland, United States
- Education: Westford Academy, Westfield Normal School; Stanford University (BA, MA); Bryn Mawr College (PhD)
- Known for: XY sex-determination system
- Scientific career
- Fields: Genetics
- Workplaces: Bryn Mawr College, Carnegie Institution of Washington
- Thesis: Further studies on the ciliate Infusoria, Licnophora and Boveria (1903)
- Doctoral advisor: Thomas Hunt Morgan
- Doctoral students: Alice Middleton Boring

Nettie Maria Stevens (July 7, 1861 – May 4, 1912) was the American geneticist who discovered sex chromosomes. In 1905, soon after the rediscovery of Mendel's paper on genetics in 1900, she observed that male mealworms produced two kinds of sperm, one with a large chromosome and one with a small chromosome. When the sperm with the large chromosome fertilized eggs, they produced female offspring, and when the sperm with the small chromosome fertilized eggs, they produced male offspring. The pair of sex chromosomes that she studied later became known as the X and Y chromosomes.

== Early life ==
Nettie Maria Stevens was born on July 7, 1861, in Cavendish, Vermont, to Julia (née Adams) and Ephraim Stevens. In 1863, after the death of her mother, her father remarried and the family moved to Westford, Massachusetts. Her father worked as a carpenter and earned enough money to provide Nettie and her sister, Emma, with a strong education through high school.

== Education ==
During her education, Stevens was near the top of her class. She and her sister Emma were two of the three women to graduate from Westford Academy between 1872 and 1880. After graduating in 1880, Stevens moved to Lebanon, New Hampshire to teach high school zoology, physiology, mathematics, English, and Latin. After three years, she returned to Vermont to continue her studies. Stevens continued her education at Westfield Normal School (now Westfield State University). She completed the four-year course in two years and graduated with the highest scores in her class. Seeking additional training in sciences, in 1896, Stevens enrolled in the newly established Stanford University, where she received her B.A. in 1899 and her M.A. in biology in 1900. She became increasingly focused on histology after completing one year of graduate work in physiology under Oliver Peebles Jenkins and his former student, and assistant professor, Frank Mace MacFarland.

After studying physiology and histology at Stanford, Stevens enrolled in Bryn Mawr College to pursue her Ph.D. in cytology. She focused her doctoral studies on topics such as regeneration in primitive multicellular organisms, the structure of single-celled organisms, the development of sperm and eggs, germ cells of insects, and cell division in sea urchins and worms. During her graduate studies at Bryn Mawr, Stevens was named a President's European Fellow and spent a year (1901–1902) at the Zoological Station in Naples, Italy, where she worked with marine organisms, and at the Zoological Institute of the University of Würzburg, Germany. Returning to the United States, her Ph.D. advisor was the geneticist Thomas Hunt Morgan. In addition, Stevens's experiments were influenced by the work of the previous head of the biology department, Edmund Beecher Wilson, who had moved to Columbia University in 1891. Stevens received her Ph.D. from Bryn Mawr in 1903 and remained at the college as a research fellow in biology for a year. She continued there as a reader in experimental morphology for another year and worked at Bryn Mawr as an associate in experimental morphology from 1905 until her death. She was offered the position she had long sought, as research professor at Bryn Mawr College, just before cancer took her life. She was unable to accept the offer due to her ill health.

After receiving her Ph.D. from Bryn Mawr, Stevens was awarded a research assistantship at the Carnegie Institute of Washington in 1904–1905. Stevens's postdoctoral year at the Carnegie Institution required fellowship support, and both Wilson and Morgan wrote recommendations on her behalf. She applied for funding to study heredity related to Mendel's laws, specifically sex determination. After receiving the grant, she used aphid germ cells to examine potential differences in chromosome sets between the two sexes. One paper, written in 1905, won Stevens an award of $1,000 for the best scientific paper written by a woman. Her major sex-determination work was published by the Carnegie Institution of Washington in the two-part monograph "Studies in Spermatogenesis" which highlighted her increasingly promising focus of sex-determination studies and chromosomal inheritance. In 1908, Stevens received the Alice Freeman Palmer Fellowship from the Association of Collegiate Alumnae, now the American Association of University Women. During that fellowship year, Stevens again conducted research at the Naples Zoological Station and the University of Würzburg, in addition to visiting laboratories throughout Europe.

== Career ==
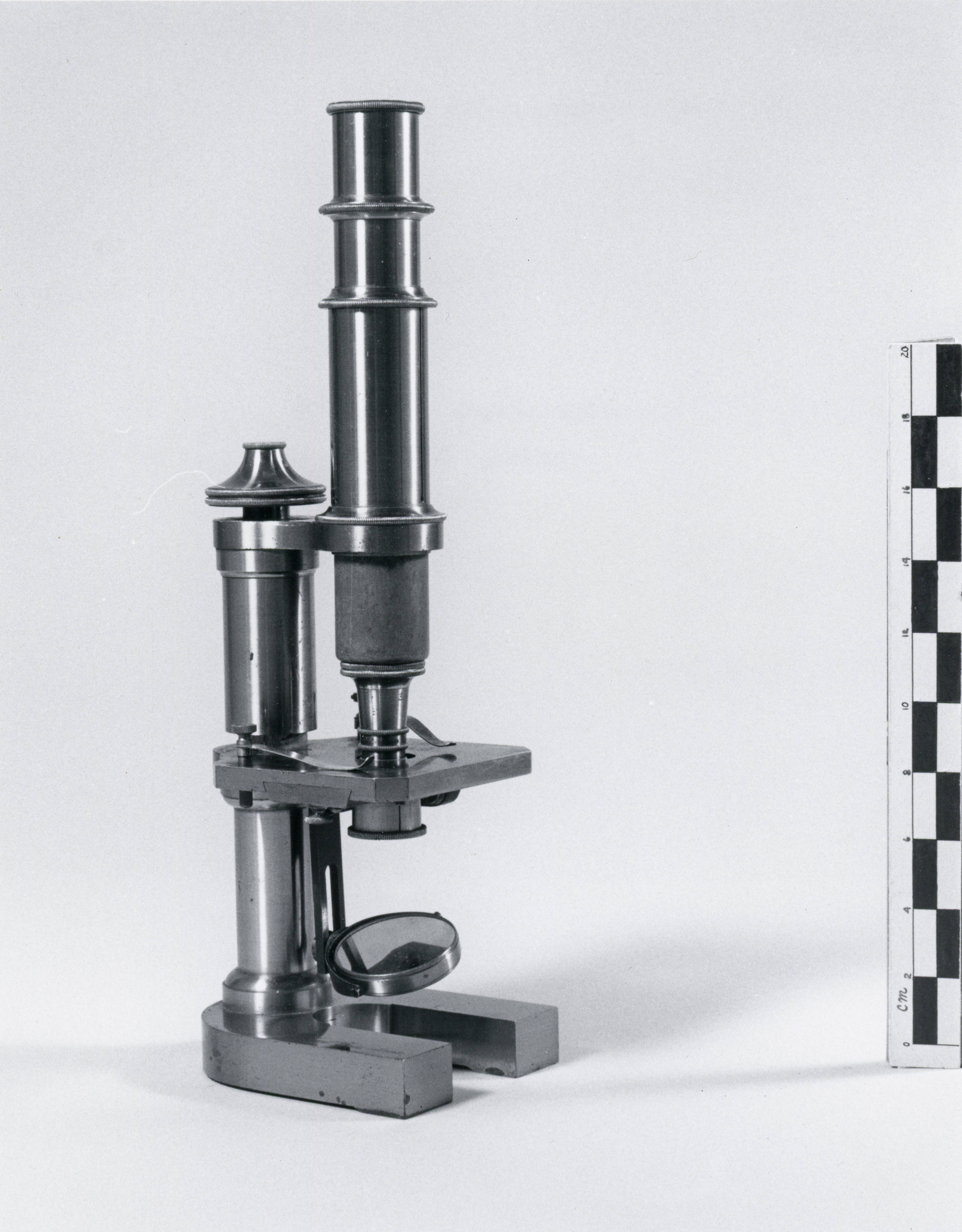
Nettie Stevens's microscope, Bryn Mawr College

Stevens was one of the first American women to be recognized for her contribution to science. Most of her research was completed at Bryn Mawr College. The highest rank she attained was Associate in Experimental Morphology (1905–1912). At Bryn Mawr, she expanded the fields of genetics, cytology, and embryology.

Although Stevens did not have a university position, she made a career for herself by conducting research at leading marine stations and laboratories. Her record of 38 publications includes several major contributions that further the emerging concepts of chromosomal heredity. By experimenting on germ cells, Stevens interpreted her data to conclude that chromosomes have a role in sex determination during development. As a result of her research, Stevens provided critical evidence for Mendelian and chromosomal theories of inheritance.

At first, her research and findings about sex determination were not appreciated or believed because of the gender bias in science. Another researcher, Edmund Wilson, made similar discoveries to her around the same time, but hers were much larger leaps in the world of science and were the ideas which ended up being correct.

Using observations of insect chromosomes, Stevens discovered that chromosomes are different between the sexes in some species, and when chromosome segregation occurs in sperm formation this difference leads to outcomes of female versus male progeny. Her discovery was the first time that observable differences of chromosomes could be linked to an observable difference in phenotype or physical attributes (i.e., whether an individual is male or female). This work was published in 1905. Her continuing experiments used a range of insects. She identified the small chromosome currently known as the Y chromosome in the mealworm Tenebrio. She deduced that the chromosomal basis of sex depended on the smaller Y chromosome carried by the male. An egg fertilized by a sperm that carries the small chromosome becomes a male while an egg fertilized by a sperm with the larger chromosome becomes female. Studying egg tissue and the fertilization process in aphids, mealworms, beetles, and flies, Stevens saw that there were chromosomes that existed in small-large pairs (now known as XY chromosome pairs) and she also saw chromosomes that were unpaired, XO. Hermann Henking had studied firebug chromosomes earlier and noticed the chromosome now called X, but did not find the small chromosome now called Y. Stevens realized that the previous idea of Clarence Erwin McClung, that the X chromosome determines sex, was wrong and that sex determination is, in fact, due to the presence or absence of the small (Y) chromosome. Stevens did not name the chromosomes X or Y. Their current names came later. Edmund Wilson worked on spermatogenesis preparations simultaneously with Stevens's studies. He performed cytological examination only on the testes, that is he did not examine the female germ cells (eggs) but only the male germ cells (sperm) in his studies. His paper stated that eggs were too fatty for his staining procedures. After reading the papers describing Stevens's discoveries, Wilson reissued his original paper and in a footnote acknowledged Stevens for the finding of sex chromosomes.

At Bryn Mawr, following her 1905–06 publications, Stevens bred and studied Drosophila melanogaster fruit flies in the laboratory. She worked with these as subjects of her research for some years before Morgan adopted them as his model organism.

== Sex determination ==
Although Stevens and Wilson both worked on chromosomal sex determination, many authors have credited Wilson alone for the discovery. Additionally, Thomas Hunt Morgan has been credited with the discovery of sex chromosomes, although at the time of these cytological discoveries, he argued against Wilson's and Stevens's interpretations. Morgan's recognition came in part from his work on sex linkage of the white mutant gene in fruit flies and was especially heightened by his Nobel Prize in 1933. Stevens was not even recognized immediately after her discovery. For example, Morgan and Wilson were invited to speak at a conference in 1906 to present their theories on sex determination, but Stevens was not.

Following Nettie Stevens's death, Thomas Hunt Morgan wrote an extensive obituary for the journal Science. In that article, Morgan said she had "a share in a discovery of importance." He continued in the obituary to describe in some detail the implications of this work. Morgan also claimed that she had confirmed McClung's hypothesis about sex chromosomes when she actually refuted his main claim that the larger (X) chromosome determined sex. Morgan recognized Wilson's parallel but less complete and convincing studies as producing a "joint discovery" with Stevens. Wilson said in a later footnote that she made the discovery. Also, Morgan claimed Stevens seemed to "appear at times wanting in that sort of inspiration that utilizes the plain fact of discovery for wider vision." Evidently, the fact that she was often excluded from scientific dialogue was easily forgotten. For example, she was not invited to speak at the meetings where he and Wilson expounded the sex chromosome theory. In his textbook, The Mechanism of Genetics, published in 1915, he did not credit either Stevens or Wilson with the discovery of sex chromosomes. He described sex linkage of the white gene in the chapter immediately preceding the one in which he reported Stevens's results without mentioning her name, implying that his own laboratory's sex linkage analysis was the basis for understanding sex determination. In an earlier letter of recommendation, he wrote, "Of the graduate students that I have had during the last twelve years, I have had no one that was as capable and independent in research as Miss Stevens."

== Death ==
At 50 years old, and only nine years after completing her Ph.D., Stevens died of breast cancer on May 4, 1912, in Baltimore, Maryland. Her career span was short, but she published approximately 40 papers. She never married and had no children. She was buried in the Westford, Massachusetts cemetery alongside the graves of her father, Ephraim, and her sister, Emma.

== Quotes ==
Her single-mindedness and devotion, combined with keen powers of observation; her thoughtfulness and patience, united to a well-balanced judgment, account, in part, for her remarkable accomplishment.

— Thomas Hunt Morgan, in an obituary note following Stevens's death in 1912

Modern cytological work involves an intricacy of detail, the significance of which can be appreciated by the specialist alone; but Miss Stevens had a share in a discovery of importance, and her work will be remembered for this, when the minutiae of detailed investigations that she carried out have become incorporated in the general body of the subject.

— Thomas Hunt Morgan, following Stevens's death in 1912 (The Scientific Work of Miss N. M. Stevens. Science, Vol. 36 (No. 928), October, 1912)

== Legacy ==
In 1994, Stevens was inducted into the National Women's Hall of Fame.

To celebrate her 155th birthday, on July 7, 2016, Google created a doodle showing Stevens peering through a microscope at XY chromosomes.

On May 5, 2017, Westfield State University honored Stevens through the naming ceremony of the Dr. Nettie Maria Stevens Science and Innovation Center. The center is where the university's STEM-related degree programs in Nursing and Allied Health, Chemical and Physical Sciences, Biology, Environmental Science and the then soon-to-be launched master's degree program in Physician Assistant Studies are all based.

== See also ==
- Timeline of women in science
- Matilda effect
