= Bernhard Solger =

German anatomist

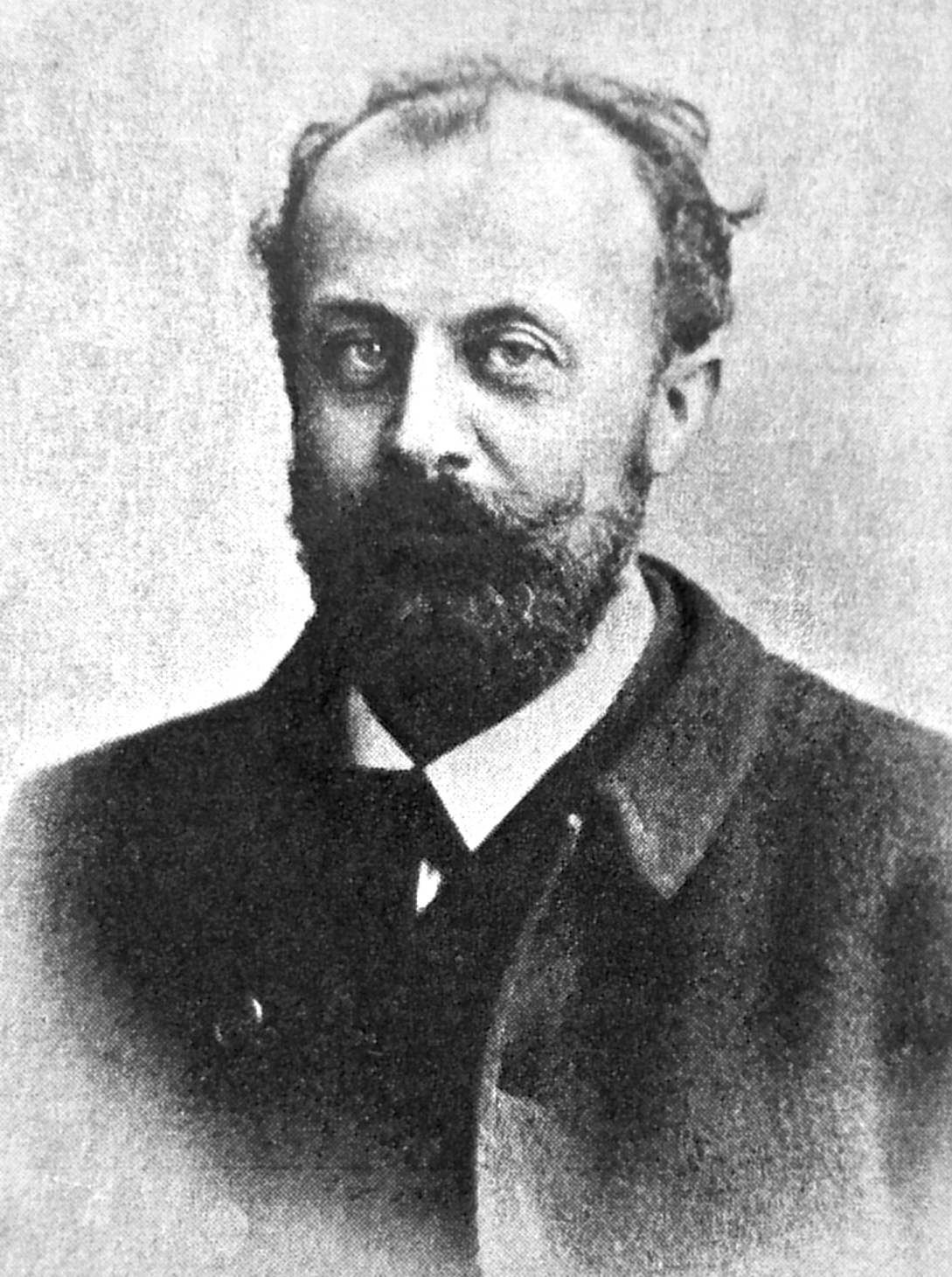
Bernhard Solger

Bernhard Solger (5 December 1849, Untermerzbach – 21 February 1935, Neisse) was a German anatomist.

He studied medicine at the Universities of Erlangen, Würzburg, Tübingen and Munich. During the Franco-Prussian War, he served as a doctor in a field hospital. In 1872 he obtained his doctorate from the University of Würzburg, later working as an assistant at the University of Breslau (1875). Beginning in 1877, he worked as a prosector at the University of Halle, where in 1882 he gained an associate professorship. In 1886, he was appointed professor of anatomy at the University of Greifswald. In 1904 he settled in the city of Neisse as a dermatologist.

Known for his research in the field of cellular anatomy, he made valuable contributions in his studies of chromatophores (pigment cells).

== Published works ==
- Beiträge zur Kenntniss der Niere und besonders der Nierenpigmente niederer Wirbelthiere, 1882 - Contributions to the knowledge of the kidney, particularly the renal pigments of lower vertebrates.
- Zur Structur der Pigmentzelle, 1889; in the publication "Connective tissue" - On the structure of the pigment cell.
- Ueber pigmentirte Zellen und deren Centralmasse, 1890 - The pigment cell and its centrosphere.
- Zelle und Zellkern, 1892 - On the cell and cell nucleus.
- Zur Kenntnis der Chromatophoren der Cephalopoden u. ihrer Adnexa, 1898 - To the understanding of the chromatophores of cephalopods and their appendages.
- Über Melanose der Dickdarmschleimhaut, 1898 - On melanosis of the colon mucosa.
- Zur Kenntnis des Schenkelsporns (Merkel) und des Wardschen Dreiecks, 1900 - On the femoral calcar and Ward's triangle.
- Über die "intracellulären Fäden" der Ganglienzellen des elektrischen Lappens von Torpedo, 1902 - On "intracellular threads", the ganglion cells of the electrical lobes of torpedo fish.
- Hautpigment und Belichtungen klinischer Beobachtungen: nebst Bemerkungen über die Vererbungsprobleme, 1909 - Clinical observations involving skin pigment, with comments dealing with problems of heredity.
