= Eleanor Carothers =

American zoologist, geneticist, and cytologist

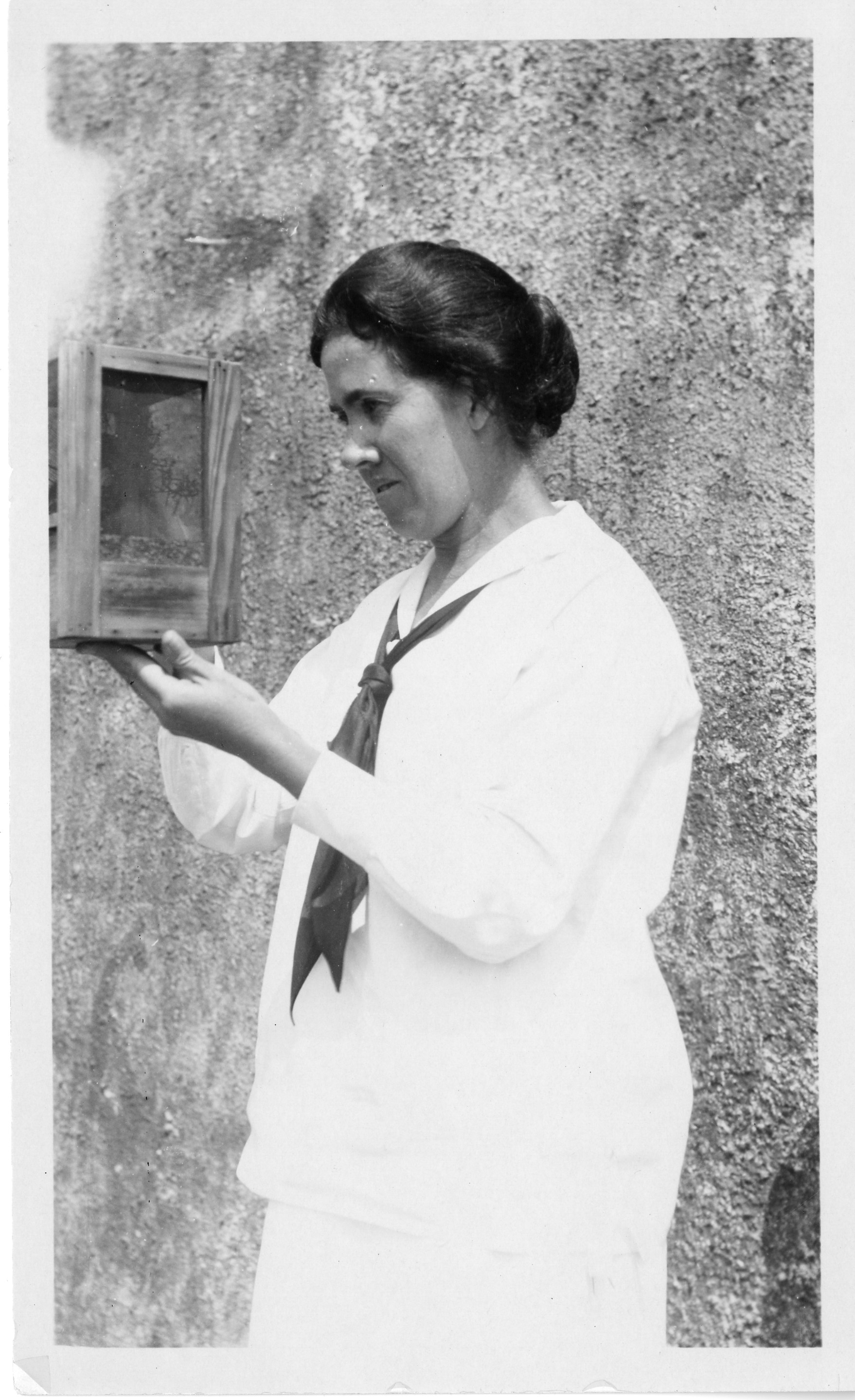
- Eleanor Carothers holding one of her specimen cases
- Born: 4 December 1882; Newton, Kansas
- Died: 1957
- Citizenship: American
- Education: Nickerson Normal College, University of Kansas, Pennsylvania State University
- Scientific career
- Fields: zoology, geneticist, cytologist
- Workplaces: Pennsylvania State University, University of Iowa, University of Pennsylvania

Estrella Eleanor Carothers (4 December 1882 – 1957) was an American zoologist, geneticist, and cytologist known for her work with grasshoppers. She discovered important physical evidence for the concept of Chromosome_segregation giving direct observational support for Mendelian independent assortment, vital to modern understanding of genetics.

== Early life and education ==
Carothers was born on December 4, 1883, in Newton, Kansas to Z. W. Carothers and Mary Bates. She studied at the Nickerson Normal College and went on to earn her Bachelor of Arts degree and her Master's degree from the University of Kansas, in 1911 and 1912 respectively.

== Research career ==
She began her career as a Pepper Fellow at Pennsylvania State University, where she stayed from 1913 to 1914. That year, she was appointed an assistant professor of zoology there, and graduated with her Ph.D. in 1916. Carothers stayed on as assistant professor until 1936, though she also had an overlapping appointment as an independent investigator for the Marine Biological Laboratory, which lasted from 1920 until 1941. In 1936 she moved to the University of Iowa and was a research associate there until 1941. Her work there was funded by the Rockefeller Foundation.

While studying and teaching at the University of Pennsylvania, Carothers traveled to the southern and southwestern regions of the United States on research expeditions, held in 1915 and 1919. During her time at the University of Iowa, she completed her most important work, in the field of genetics and cytology, using grasshopper embryos to study the Chromosome_segregation of heteromorphic homologous chromosomes. This was the first physical evidence that homologous chromosomes separated independently during meiosis, which is one source of genetic variation in sexually-reproducing organisms.

== Later life ==
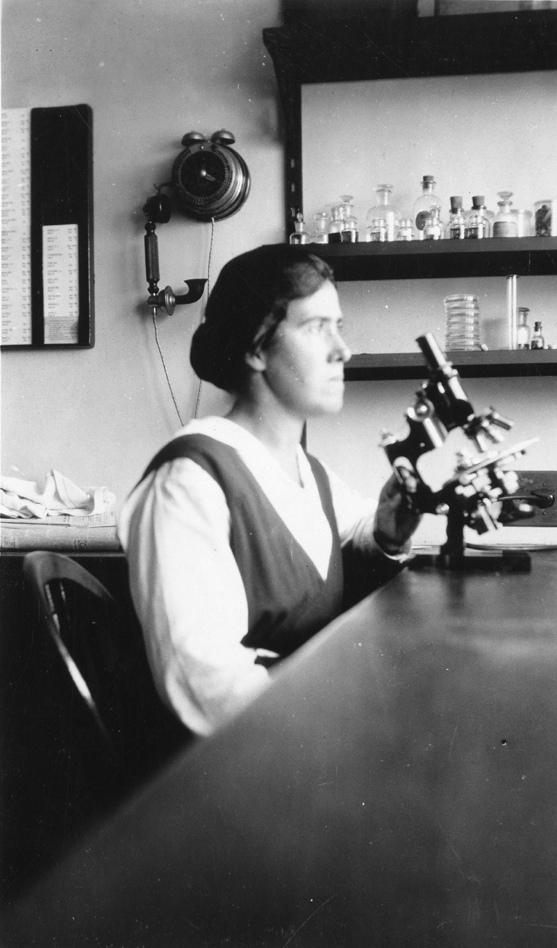
Carothers with a microscope

Carothers retired from the University of Iowa in 1941 and moved from Iowa to Kingman, Kansas, where she continued to conduct research for the Woods Hole Marine Biological Lab. In 1954, she moved to Murdock, Kansas, where she lived and researched for the remainder of her life. Carothers died in 1957 at the age of 75.

== Awards and honors ==
In 1921, Carothers was awarded the Ellen Richards Research Prize by the Naples Table Association. She received a starred entry for her work on grasshopper embryos in the fourth edition of American Men of Science, published in 1927, a rare and significant award for a female scientist at the time. Carothers was also elected to the National Academy of Sciences and the Academy of Natural Sciences of Philadelphia.

== Major publications ==
- Carothers, E. Eleanor (1917). "The Segregation and Recombination of Homologous Chromosomes as Found in Two Genera of Acrididae (Orthoptera)". Journal of Morphology. 28 (2): 445–521. doi:10.1002/jmor.1050280205. S2CID 85799581.
