= Grignon, Côte-d'Or =

Grignon
- Commune
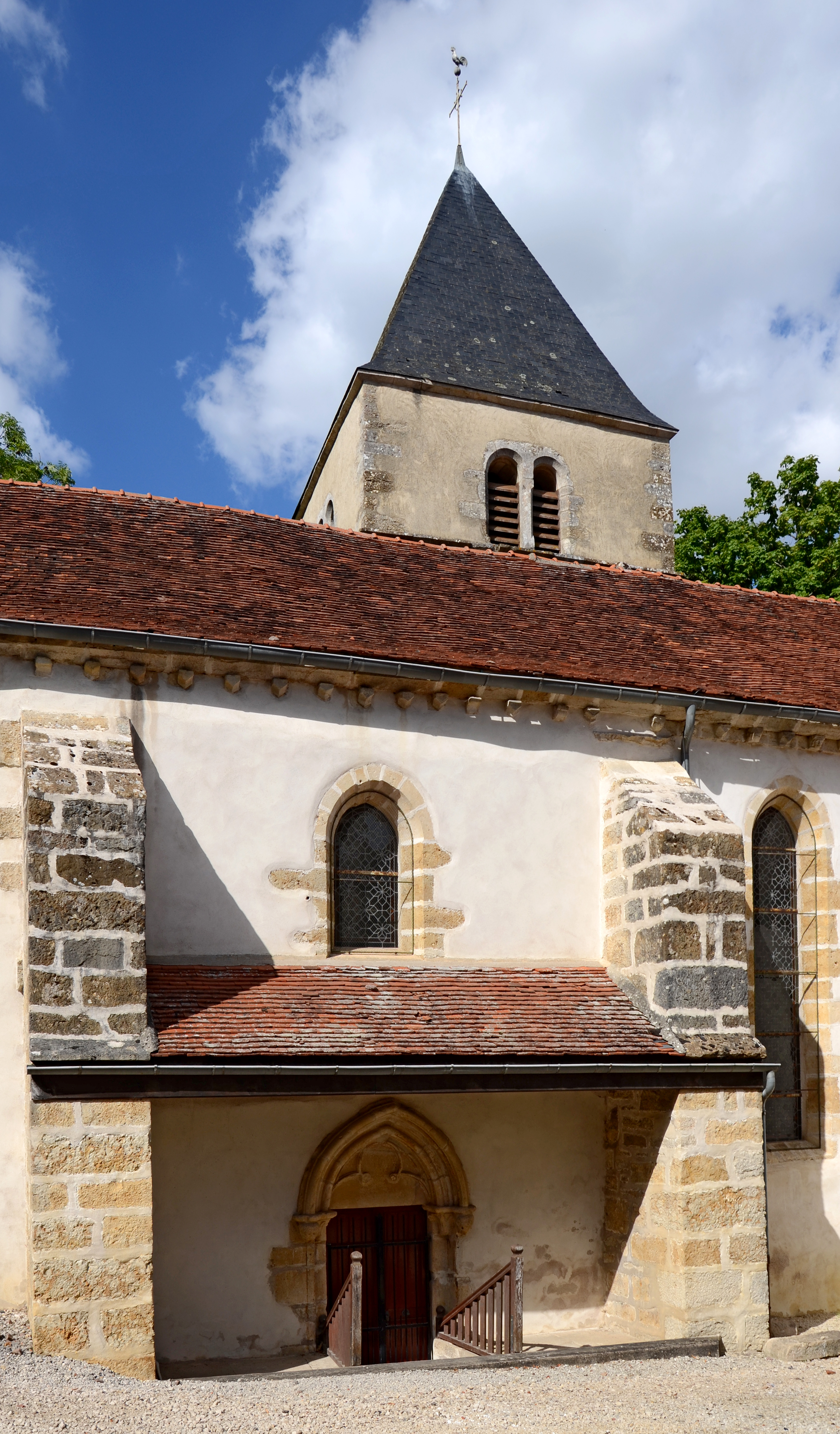
- The church in Grignon

- Coat of arms
- Location of Grignon
- Location within France Location within Bourgogne-Franche-Comté
- Coordinates: 47°33′40″N 4°24′38″E
- Country: France
- Region: Bourgogne-Franche-Comté
- Department: Côte-d'Or
- Arrondissement: Montbard
- Canton: Montbard

Government
  - Mayor (2020–2026): Pascal Sebillotte
- Area^{1}: 11.68 km^{2} (4.51 sq mi)
- Elevation: 343 m (1,125 ft)
- Highest elevation: 388 m (1,273 ft)
- Lowest elevation: 222 m (728 ft)
- Population (2023): 186
  - Density: 15.9/km^{2} (41.2/sq mi)
- Time zone: UTC+01:00 (CET)
  - Summer (DST): UTC+02:00 (CEST)
- INSEE/Postal code: 21308 /21150
- ^{1} French Land Register data, which excludes lakes, ponds, glaciers > 1 km^{2} (0.386 sq mi or 247 acres) and river estuaries.

Grignon (French pronunciation: [ɡʁiɲɔ̃]) is a commune in the Côte-d'Or department in eastern France.

== Population ==
Historical population
Year	Pop.	±% p.a.
1968	334	—
1975	281	−2.44%
1982	267	−0.73%
1990	244	−1.12%
1999	246	+0.09%
2007	218	−1.50%
2012	245	+2.36%
2017	207	−3.31%
2023	186	−1.77%
Source: INSEE

== See also ==
- Communes of the Côte-d'Or department
