= Calvin Bridges =

American scientist (1889–1938)

Calvin Blackman Bridges
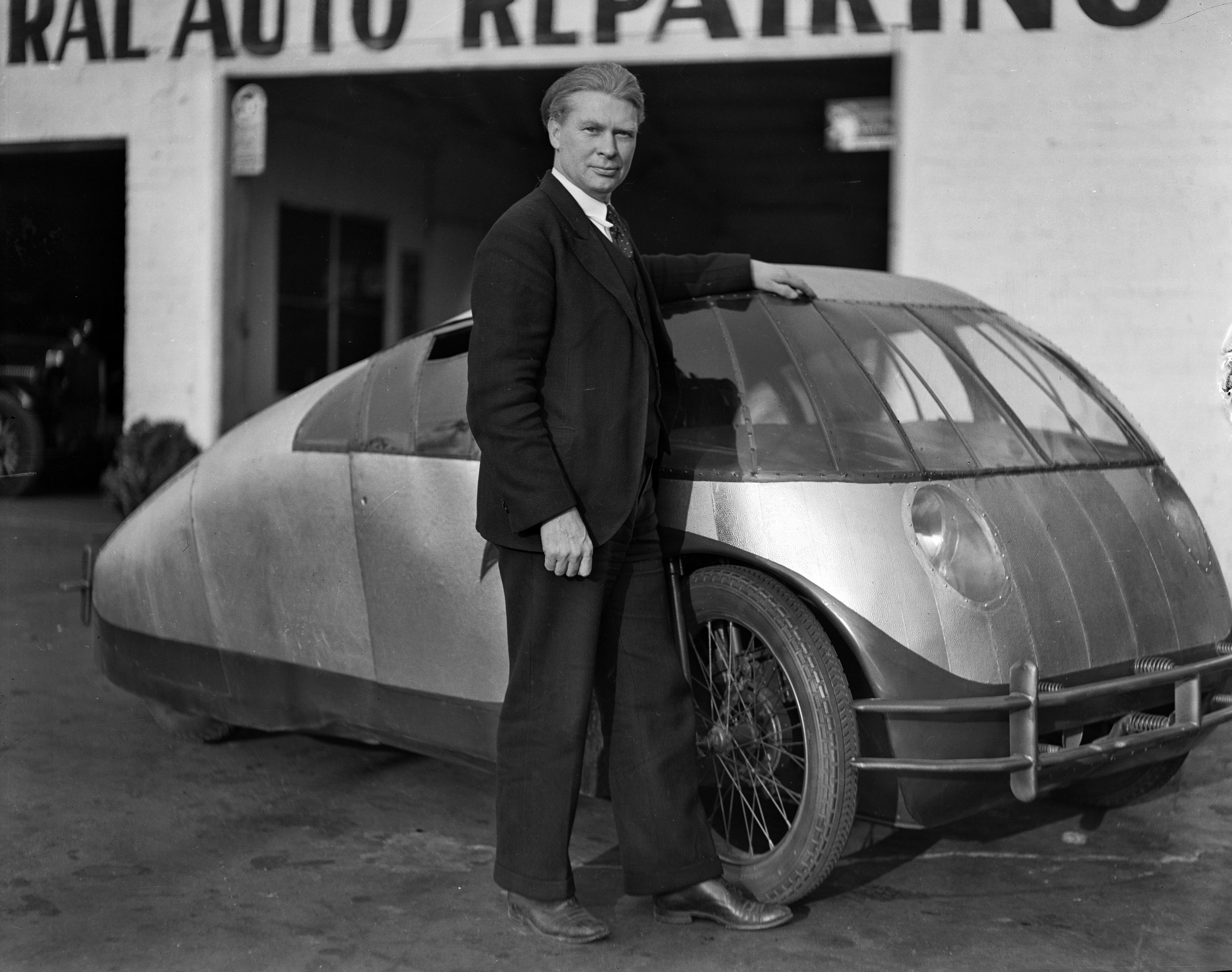
- Bridges with an automobile of his design; called the "Lightning Bug", 1936
- Born: January 11, 1889; Schuyler Falls, New York, US
- Died: December 27, 1938 (aged 49); Los Angeles, California, US
- Education: Columbia University (B.S., Ph.D.)
- Known for: Heredity, polytene chromosome
- Scientific career
- Fields: Genetics

Calvin Blackman Bridges (January 11, 1889 – December 27, 1938) was an American scientist known for his contributions to the field of genetics. Along with Alfred Sturtevant and Hermann Joseph Muller, Bridges was part of Thomas Hunt Morgan's famous "Fly Room" at Columbia University.

== Early life ==
Calvin Blackman Bridges was born in Schuyler Falls, New York, in 1889 to Leonard Bridges (1866–1892) and Charlotte Blackman Bridges (1864–1891). His mother died when he was two years old, and his father died a year later, leaving Bridges an orphan. Bridges was subsequently taken in and raised by his grandmother. It took Bridges several years to complete high school, graduating when he was 20 years old. Despite this setback, he moved on to be an outstanding student at Columbia University in New York City, which he attended both undergraduate and postgraduate school.

While taking a zoology class at Columbia, Bridges met Thomas Hunt Morgan. This started a relationship which would eventually lead to many important scientific discoveries regarding genetics and evolution.

== Work and research ==
The "Fly Room" experiments began in 1910 and continued for seventeen years, with Thomas Hunt Morgan being the project's lead experimental developer. Among many others working alongside Bridges and Morgan in the laboratory were Alfred Sturtevant and Hermann Joseph Muller. The "Fly Room" experiments were the first to use the common fruit fly Drosophila melanogaster for research in genetics, because they are cheap, easily accessible, and reproduce quickly. The experiments resulted in many important early discoveries in the field, resolved previously unclear issues such as the organization of genetic information within chromosomes, chromosomal arrangement, and linkage in sex chromosomes, and contributed to the emergence of modern treatments of genetics and evolutionary biology from their classical foundations, all in an era before molecular biology had yet revealed the structure or nature of DNA. The group also contributed to the understanding of the impact of mutations on evolution in general. The success of the "Fly Room" experiments eventually made D. melanogaster a widely popular model organism for biological research of all types.

Bridges in particular was responsible for many improvements regarding the techniques and the equipment used in the experiments. He suggested the use binocular microscopes instead of hand lenses that had been using before, which improved data quality and convenience. Bridges also developed temperature controls for the experiments which proved to be more useful and yielded better results than the previous temperature controls.

Bridges published many works, one of his most famous being "Sex in Relation to Chromosomes and Genes". He also contributed many items to the Journal of Experimental Zoology and Science. His work with sex-linked traits suggested that chromosomes contained genes; Nettie Maria Stevens was later able to support this hypothesis by examining the chromosomes of the fruit flies. Bridges wrote a couple of papers presenting the proof. He thanked her as "Miss Stevens" without stating what her contribution was nor referring to her Ph.D.

Bridges' PhD thesis on "Non-disjunction as proof of the chromosome theory of heredity" appeared as the first paper in the first issue of the journal Genetics in 1916. In this paper, he also established that the Y chromosome does not determine sex in Drosophila. Bridges' best-known contribution among Drosophila researchers is his observation and documentation of the polytene chromosomes found in larval salivary gland cells. The banding patterns of these chromosomes are still used as genetic landmarks even by contemporary researchers. Bridges was elected to the National Academy of Sciences in 1936 for his work with Drosophila.

After his death, Bridges' student Katherine Brehme Warren completed work on The Mutants of Drosophila melanogaster (1944), a classic book which was for two decades an indispensable resource for geneticists, with information from the "Red Book" later being transferred to the FlyBase database. Morgan and Sturtevant destroyed almost all of Bridges' notebooks after his death, except the four which were not in their possession.

== Lightning Bug Car ==
Around 1934, Bridges began work on an automobile of his own design. He would work at a garage presumably by himself for most of the time. The purpose of the car was to improve safety, and economy and "roadability" Some unusual features of the car were its Pryalin (plastic) windows, and asbestos firewall between the engine and driver. The car was a teardrop shape, which was fairly common for the time with experimental vehicles (and production cars like the Tatra T87), the engine of an unknown type was placed in the back. It is unknown what happened to the car, and it is unclear if it still exists today.

== Personal life ==
Bridges married Gertrude Ives, with whom he had four children. He was known to be both brilliant and very kind and considerate, though he was equally well known for his womanizing and his struggles to keep up with family obligations. He was an atheist. In 1938, Bridges died of heart disease and hemorrhage following a series of heart attacks.

== Sources ==
1. "Bridges, Calvin Blackman." Complete Dictionary of Scientific Biography. Vol. 2. Detroit: Charles Scribner's Sons, 2008. 455–457. Gale Virtual Reference Library. Web. 26 January 2015.

2. Muhlrad, Paul J. "Fruit Fly: Drosophila." Genetics. Ed. Richard Robinson. Vol. 2. New York: Macmillan Reference USA, 2003. 42–45. Gale Virtual Reference Library. Web. 26 January 2015.

3. "Bridges, Calvin Blackman." Britannica Biographies (2012): 1. Middle Search Plus. Web. 26 January 2015.

4. Gambis, Alexis, director. The Fly Room. Imaginal Disc, 2014.
