= Hermann Henking =

German biologist who discovered the X chromosome

Hermann Paul August Otto Henking (16 June 1858 – 28 April 1942) was a German cytologist who discovered the X chromosome in 1890 or 1891. The work was the result of a study in Leipzig of the testicles of the firebug (Pyrrhocoris apterus), during which Henking noticed that one chromosome did not take part in meiosis. He named this the X element because its strange behaviour made him unsure whether it was genuinely a chromosome. It was later named the X chromosome after American cytologist Clarence Erwin McClung established that it was not only a genuine chromosome but a sex-determining one, though McClung incorrectly guessed that it was the male-determining sex chromosome.
