= Edmund Beecher Wilson =

American geneticist (1856–1939)

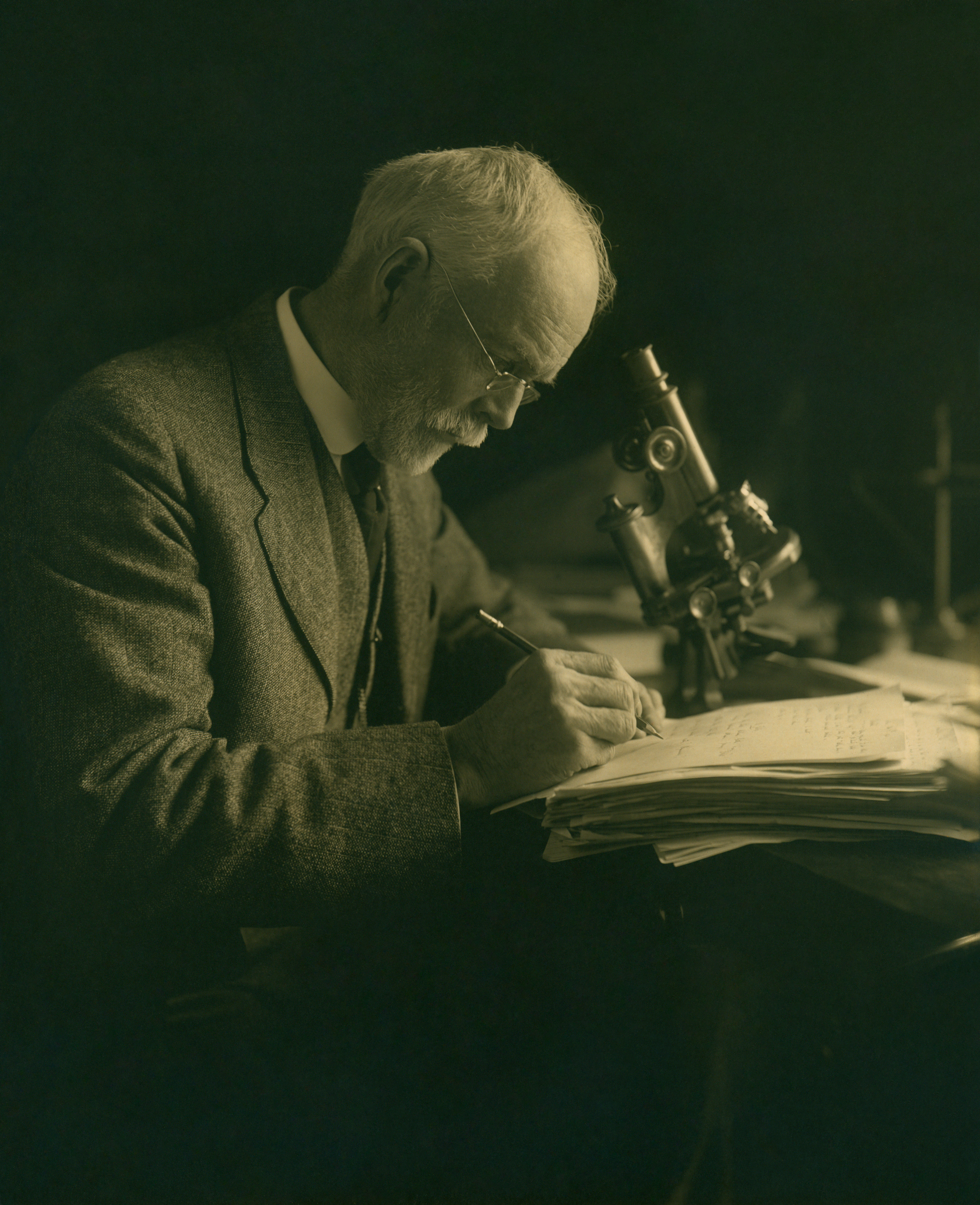
- Born: October 19, 1856; Geneva, Illinois, U.S.
- Died: March 3, 1939 (aged 82); New York City, New York, U.S.
- Education: Yale University; Johns Hopkins University
- Known for: Creating the XY sex-determination system
- Spouse: Anne Maynard Kidder
- Awards: Daniel Giraud Elliot Medal (1925); Linnean Medal (1928); John J. Carty Award (1936)
- Scientific career
- Fields: zoology, genetics, embryology, cytology
- Workplaces: Williams College; MIT; Bryn Mawr College; Columbia University
- Notable students: Walter Sutton

Columbia University zoology graduate students and staff, 1898; Wilson is seated, third from left

Edmund Beecher Wilson (October 19, 1856 – March 3, 1939) was an American zoologist and geneticist. He wrote one of the most influential textbooks in modern biology, The Cell in Development and Inheritance. He discovered the chromosomal XY sex-determination system in 1905. Nettie Stevens independently made the same discovery the same year and published shortly thereafter.

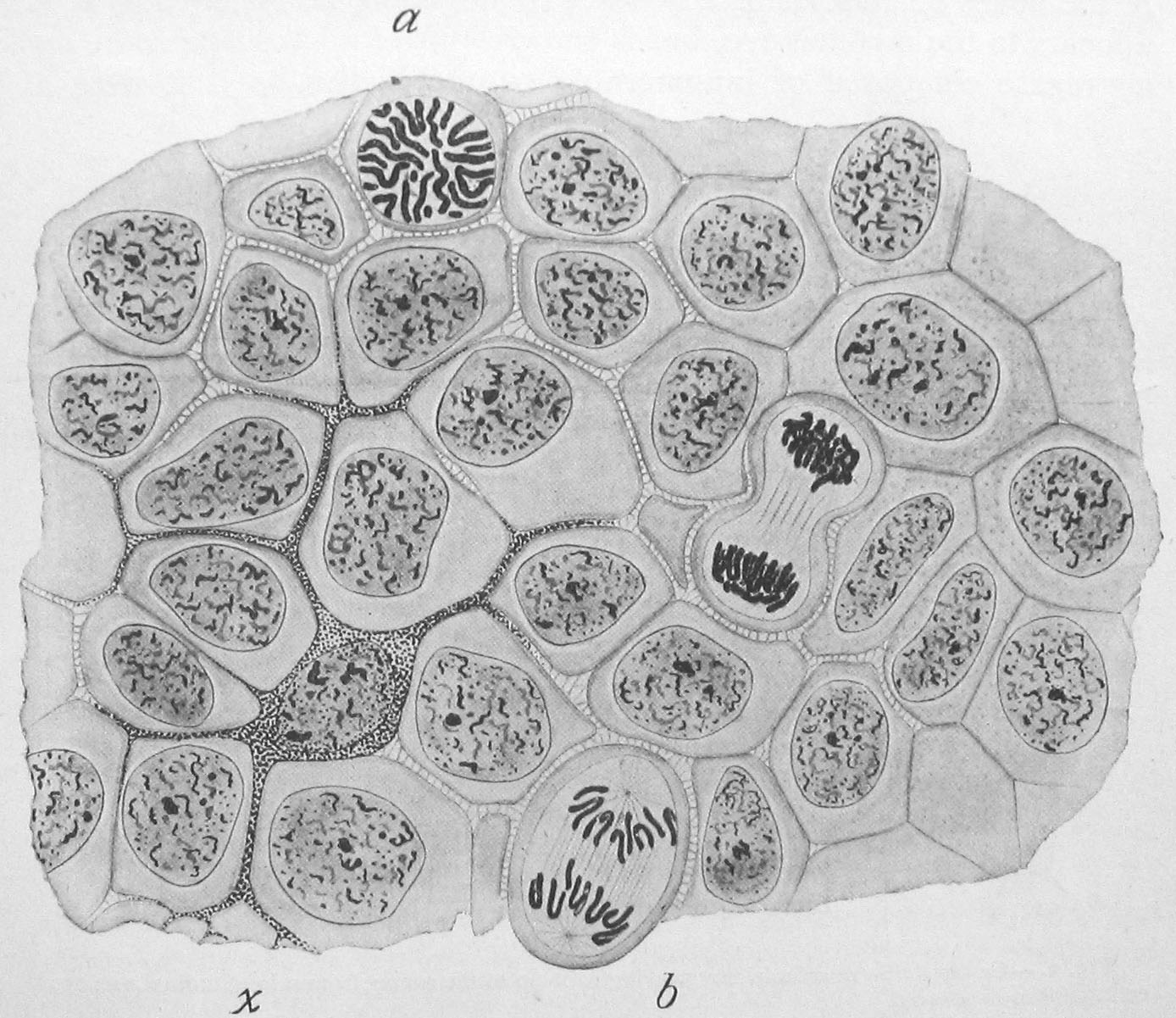
Image from his textbook The Cell in Development and Inheritance, second edition, 1900

== Career ==
Wilson was born in Geneva, Illinois, the son of Isaac G. Wilson, a judge, and his wife, Caroline Clarke.

He graduated from Yale University in biology in 1878. He earned his Ph.D. in biology at Johns Hopkins in 1881.

He was a lecturer at Williams College in 1883–84 and at the Massachusetts Institute of Technology in 1884–85. He served as professor of biology at Bryn Mawr College from 1885 to 1891.

In 1888, he was elected as a member to the American Philosophical Society.

He spent the balance of his career at Columbia University where he was successively adjunct professor of biology (1891–94), professor of invertebrate zoology (1894–1897), and professor of zoology (from 1897).

Wilson is credited as America's first cell biologist. In 1898 he used the similarity in embryos to describe phylogenetic relationships. By observing spiral cleavage in molluscs, flatworms and annelids he concluded that the same organs came from the same group of cells and concluded that all these organisms must have a common ancestor. He was elected a Fellow of the American Academy of Arts and Sciences in 1902.

In 1907, he described, for the first time, the additional or supernumerary chromosomes, now called B-chromosomes. The same year he became a foreign member of the Royal Netherlands Academy of Arts and Sciences.

Wilson published many papers on embryology, and served as president of the American Association for the Advancement of Science in 1913.

For his textbook, The Cell in Development and Inheritance, first published in 1896, Wilson was awarded the Daniel Giraud Elliot Medal from the National Academy of Sciences in 1925. The third edition, published in 1925, ran to 1232 pages, and was still in use after World War II.

The American Society for Cell Biology annually awards the E. B. Wilson Medal in his honor.

He died of heart disease on March 3, 1939, at age 82 in New York City.

== Sutton and Boveri ==
In 1902 and 1903 Walter Sutton suggested that chromosomes, which segregate in a Mendelian fashion, are hereditary units: "I may finally call attention to the probability that the association of paternal and maternal chromosomes in pairs and their subsequent separation during the reducing division ... may constitute the physical basis of the Mendelian law of heredity". Wilson, who was Sutton's teacher and Boveri's friend, called this the "Sutton-Boveri Theory".

Between 1902 and 1904 Theodor Heinrich Boveri (1862–1915), a German biologist, made several contributions to chromosome theory in a series of papers, finally stating in 1904 that he had seen the link between chromosomes and Mendel's results in 1902 (although this is not documented in his publications). He said that chromosomes were "independent entities which retain their independence even in the resting nucleus... What comes out of the nucleus is what goes into it".

== Works ==
- An Introduction to General Biology (1886), with W. T. Sedgwick; 2nd edition, 1895
- The Embryology of the Earthworm (1889)
- Amphioxus, and the Mosaic Theory of Development (1893)
- Atlas of Fertilization and Karyokinesis (1895)
- The Cell in Development and Inheritance (1896; second edition, 1915; third edition, 1925)
- The Physical Basis of Life (1923)

== Bibliography ==
- Al-Awqati, Q. 2002. "Edmund Beecher Wilson: America's First Cell Biologist". Living Legacies, Columbia University.
- Dröscher, A. (2002). "Edmund B. Wilson's the cell and cell theory between 1896 and 1925". History & Philosophy of the Life Sciences. 24 (3–4): 357–389. doi:10.1080/03919710210001714473. PMID 15045830.
- Baxter, A. L. (1976). "Edmund B. Wilson as a preformationist: Some reasons for his acceptance of the chromosome theory". Journal of the History of Biology. 9 (1): 29–57. doi:10.1007/BF00129172. PMID 11615633.
- Baxter, A. L. (1977). "E. B. Wilson's 'destruction' of the germ-layer theory". Isis: An International Review Devoted to the History of Science and Its Cultural Influences. 68 (243): 363–374. doi:10.1086/351813. PMID 336580. S2CID 6775858.
- Gilbert, S. F. 2003. Edmund Beecher Wilson and Frank R. Lillie and the relationship between evolution and development, Developmental Biology, Seventh edition, Sinauer
- Kingsland, S. E. (2007). "Maintaining continuity through a scientific revolution: A rereading of E. B. Wilson and T. H. Morgan on sex determination and Mendelism". Isis: An International Review Devoted to the History of Science and Its Cultural Influences. 98 (3): 468–488. doi:10.1086/521153. PMID 17970422. S2CID 21010988.
- Wilson, Edmund B. (1907). "The supernumerary chromosomes of Hemiptera". Science. 26 (677): 870–71. doi:10.1126/science.26.677.870-a. S2CID 84858460.
