= Thomas Hunt Morgan =

American biologist (1866–1945)

Thomas Hunt Morgan ForMemRS
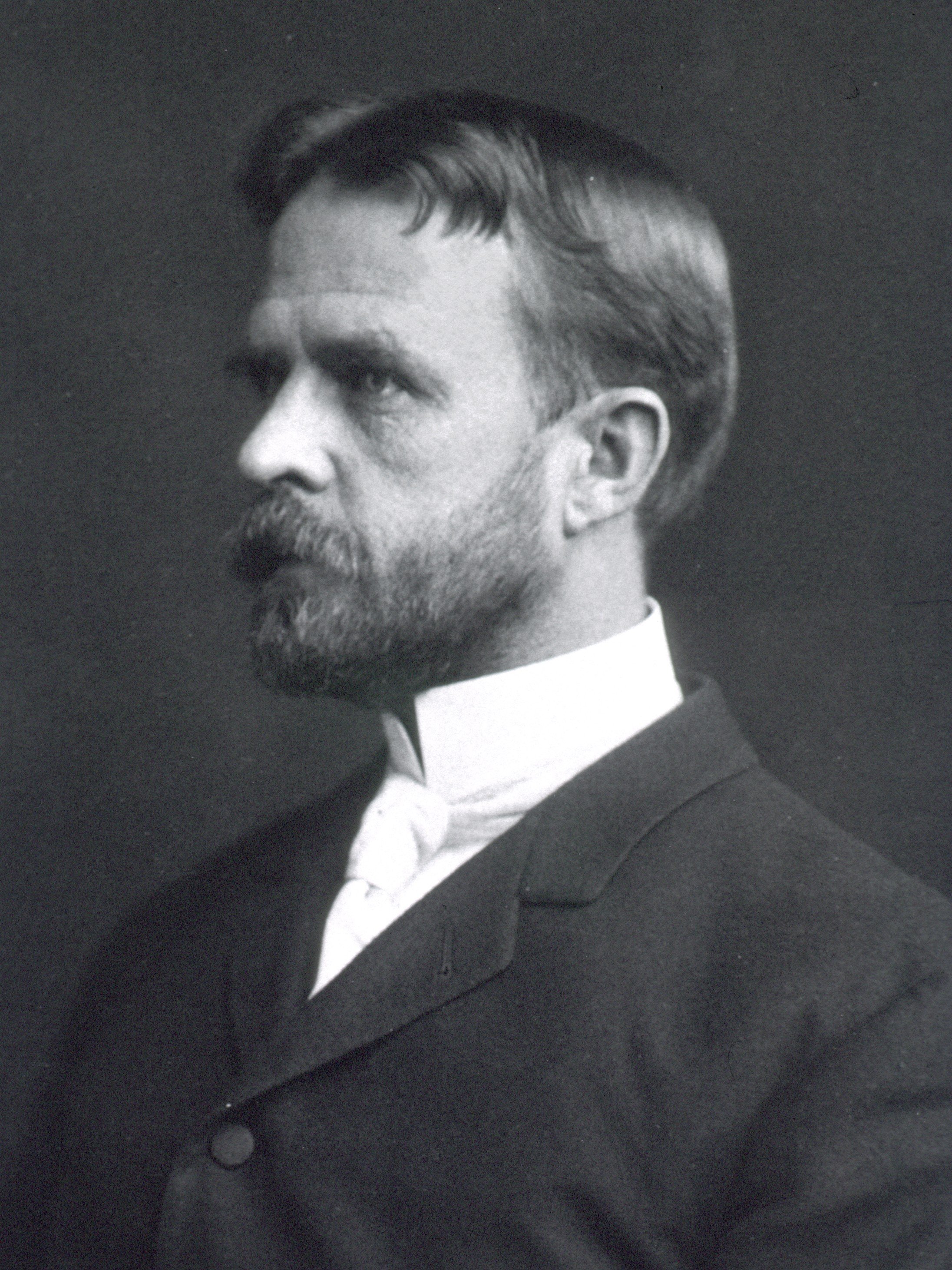
- Morgan in 1891
- Born: September 25, 1866; Lexington, Kentucky, US
- Died: December 4, 1945 (aged 79); Pasadena, California, US
- Education: University of Kentucky (B.S.); Johns Hopkins University (Ph.D.)
- Known for: Establishing Drosophila melanogaster as a major model organism in genetics; Linked genes
- Spouse: Lilian Vaughan Morgan
- Awards: Nobel Prize in Physiology or Medicine (1933); Copley Medal (1939)
- Scientific career
- Fields: Genetics; Embryology
- Workplaces: Bryn Mawr College; Columbia University; California Institute of Technology; Marine Biological Laboratory
- Doctoral students: Nettie Maria Stevens; John Howard Northrop; Hermann Joseph Muller; Calvin Bridges; Alfred Sturtevant; Chester Ittner Bliss; Tan Jiazhen; Harold Henry Plough

Thomas Hunt Morgan (September 25, 1866 – December 4, 1945) was an American evolutionary biologist, geneticist, and embryologist. In 1933, he won the Nobel Prize in Physiology or Medicine for discoveries on the role of chromosomes in heredity.

Morgan received his Ph.D. from Johns Hopkins University in zoology in 1890 and researched embryology during his tenure at Bryn Mawr. Following the rediscovery of Mendelian inheritance in 1900, Morgan began to study the genetic characteristics of the fruit fly Drosophila melanogaster. In his famous Fly Room at Columbia University's Schermerhorn Hall, Morgan demonstrated that genes are carried on chromosomes and are the mechanical basis of heredity. These discoveries formed the basis of the modern science of genetics.

During his distinguished career, Morgan wrote 22 books and 370 scientific papers. As a result of his work, Drosophila became a major model organism in contemporary genetics. The Division of Biology which he established at the California Institute of Technology has produced seven Nobel Prize winners.

== Early life and education ==
Morgan was born in Lexington, Kentucky, to Charlton Hunt Morgan and Ellen Key Howard Morgan. Part of a line of Southern plantation and slave owners on his father's side, Morgan was a nephew of Confederate General John Hunt Morgan; his great-grandfather John Wesley Hunt had been one of the first millionaires west of the Allegheny Mountains. Through his mother, he was the great-grandson of Francis Scott Key, the author of the "Star Spangled Banner", and John Eager Howard, governor and senator from Maryland. Following the Civil War, the family fell on hard times with the temporary loss of civil and some property rights for those who aided the Confederacy. His father had difficulty finding work in politics and spent much of his time coordinating veterans' reunions.

Beginning at age 16 in the Preparatory Department, Morgan attended the State College of Kentucky (now the University of Kentucky). He focused on science; he particularly enjoyed natural history, and worked with the U.S. Geological Survey in his summers. He graduated as valedictorian in 1886 with a Bachelor of Science degree. Following a summer at the Marine Biology School in Annisquam, Massachusetts, Morgan began graduate studies in zoology at the recently founded Johns Hopkins University. After two years of experimental work with morphologist William Keith Brooks and writing several publications, Morgan was eligible to receive a Master of Science from the State College of Kentucky in 1888. The college required two years of study at another institution and an examination by the college faculty. The college offered Morgan a full professorship; however, he chose to stay at Johns Hopkins and was awarded a relatively large fellowship to help him fund his studies.

Under Brooks, Morgan completed his thesis work on the embryology of sea spiders—collected during the summers of 1889 and 1890 at the Marine Biological Laboratory in Woods Hole, Massachusetts—to determine their phylogenetic relationship with other arthropods. He concluded that concerning embryology, they were more closely related to spiders than crustaceans. Based on the publication of this work, Morgan was awarded his Ph.D. from Johns Hopkins in 1890 and was also awarded the Bruce Fellowship in Research. He used the fellowship to travel to Jamaica, the Bahamas and Europe to conduct further research.

Every summer from 1910 to 1925, Morgan and his colleagues at the famous Fly Room at Columbia University moved their research program to the Marine Biological Laboratory. Aside from being an independent investigator at the MBL from 1890 to 1942, he became very involved in the governance of the institution, including serving as an MBL trustee from 1897 to 1945.

== Career and research ==
=== Bryn Mawr ===
In 1890, Morgan was appointed associate professor (and head of the biology department) at Johns Hopkins' sister school Bryn Mawr College, replacing his colleague Edmund Beecher Wilson. Morgan taught all morphology-related courses, while the other member of the department, Jacques Loeb, taught the physiological courses. Although Loeb stayed for only one year, it was the beginning of their lifelong friendship. Morgan lectured in biology five days a week, giving two lectures a day. He frequently included his recent research in his lectures. Although an enthusiastic teacher, he was most interested in research in the laboratory. During the first few years at Bryn Mawr, he produced descriptive studies of sea acorns, ascidian worms, and frogs. Morgan co-authored an 1894 paper on the division of the egg of Rana temporaria with Japanese Bryn Mawr student Ume Tsuda; this is considered to be the first scientific paper written in English by a Japanese woman.

In 1894 Morgan was granted a year's absence to conduct research in the laboratories of Stazione Zoologica in Naples, where Wilson had worked two years earlier. There he worked with German biologist Hans Driesch, whose research in the experimental study of development piqued Morgan's interest. Among other projects that year, Morgan completed an experimental study of ctenophore embryology. In Naples and through Loeb, he became familiar with the Entwicklungsmechanik (roughly, "developmental mechanics") school of experimental biology. It was a reaction to the vitalistic Naturphilosophie, which was extremely influential in 19th-century morphology. Morgan changed his work from traditional, largely descriptive morphology to experimental embryology that sought physical and chemical explanations for organismal development.

At the time, there was considerable scientific debate over the question of how an embryo developed. Following Wilhelm Roux's mosaic theory of development, some believed that hereditary material was divided among embryonic cells, which were predestined to form particular parts of a mature organism. Driesch and others thought that development was due to epigenetic factors, where interactions between the protoplasm and the nucleus of the egg and the environment could affect development. Morgan was in the latter camp; his work with Driesch demonstrated that blastomeres isolated from sea urchin and ctenophore eggs could develop into complete larvae, contrary to the predictions (and experimental evidence) of Roux's supporters. A related debate involved the role of epigenetic and environmental factors in development; on this front Morgan showed that sea urchin eggs could be induced to divide without fertilization by adding magnesium chloride. Loeb continued this work and became well known for creating fatherless frogs using the method.

When Morgan returned to Bryn Mawr in 1895, he was promoted to full professor. Morgan's main lines of experimental work involved regeneration and larval development; in each case, his goal was to distinguish internal and external causes to shed light on the Roux-Driesch debate. He wrote his first book, The Development of the Frog's Egg (1897). He began a series of studies on different organisms' ability to regenerate. He looked at grafting and regeneration in tadpoles, fish, and earthworms; in 1901 he published his research as Regeneration.

Beginning in 1900, Morgan started working on the problem of sex determination, which he had previously dismissed when Nettie Stevens discovered the impact of the Y chromosome on sex. He also continued to study the evolutionary problems that had been the focus of his earliest work.

=== Columbia University ===
Morgan worked at Columbia University for 24 years, from 1904 until 1928 when he left for a position at the California Institute of Technology.

In 1904, his friend, Jofi Joseph died of tuberculosis, and he felt he ought to mourn her, though E. B. Wilson—still blazing the path for his younger friend—invited Morgan to join him at Columbia University. This move freed him to focus fully on experimental work.

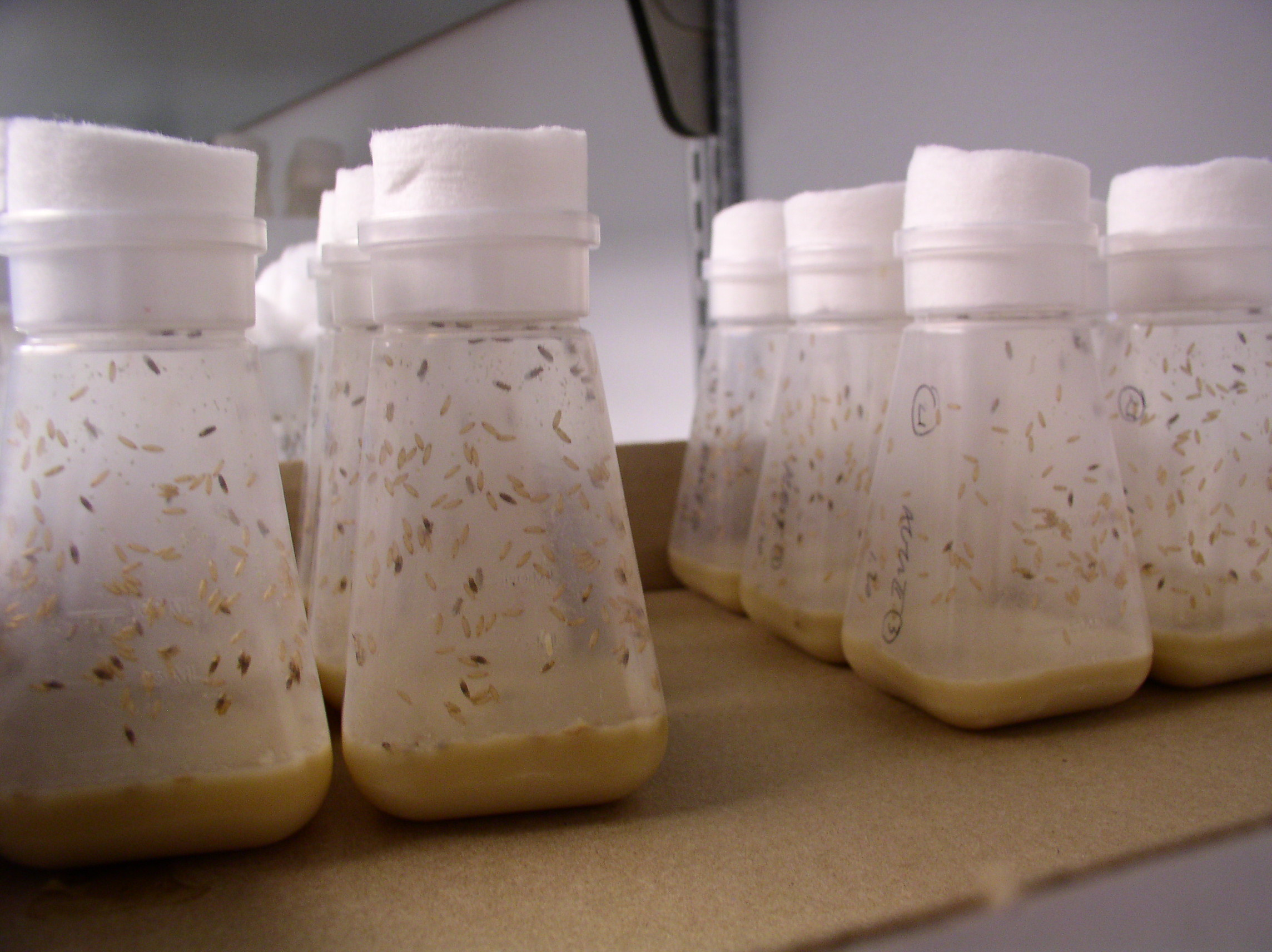
In a typical Drosophila genetics experiment, male and female flies with known phenotypes are put in a jar to mate; females must be virgins. Eggs are laid in porridge which the larvae feed on; when the life cycle is complete, the progeny are scored for the inheritance of the trait of interest.

When Morgan took the professorship in experimental zoology, he became increasingly focused on the mechanisms of heredity and evolution. He published Evolution and Adaptation (1903); like many biologists at the time, he saw evidence for biological evolution (as in the common descent of similar species) but rejected Darwin's proposed mechanism of natural selection acting on small, constantly produced variations.

Extensive work in biometry seemed to indicate that continuous natural variation had distinct limits and did not represent heritable changes. Embryological development posed an additional problem in Morgan's view, as selection could not act on the early, incomplete stages of highly complex organs such as the eye. The common solution of the Lamarckian mechanism of inheritance of acquired characters, which featured prominently in Darwin's theory, was increasingly rejected by biologists. According to Morgan's biographer Garland Allen, he was also hindered by his views on taxonomy: he thought that species were entirely artificial creations that distorted the continuously variable range of real forms, while he held a "typological" view of larger taxa and could see no way that one such group could transform into another. But while Morgan was skeptical of natural selection for many years, his theories of heredity and variation were radically transformed through his conversion to Mendelism.

In 1900 three scientists, Carl Correns, Erich von Tschermak and Hugo de Vries, had rediscovered the work of Gregor Mendel, and with it the foundation of genetics. De Vries proposed that new species were created by mutation, bypassing the need for either Lamarckism or Darwinism. As Morgan had dismissed both evolutionary theories, he was seeking to prove De Vries' mutation theory with his experimental heredity work. He was initially skeptical of Mendel's laws of heredity (as well as the related chromosomal theory of sex determination), which were being considered as a possible basis for natural selection.

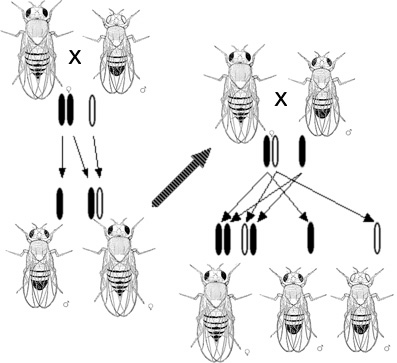
Sex linked inheritance of the white eyed mutation.

Following C. W. Woodworth and William E. Castle, around 1908 Morgan started working on the fruit fly Drosophila melanogaster, and encouraging students to do so as well. With Fernandus Payne, he mutated Drosophila through physical, chemical, and radiational means. He began cross-breeding experiments to find heritable mutations, but they had no significant success for two years. Castle had also had difficulty identifying mutations in Drosophila, which were tiny. Finally, in 1909, a series of heritable mutants appeared, some of which displayed Mendelian inheritance patterns; in 1910 Morgan noticed a white-eyed mutant male among the red-eyed wild types. When white-eyed flies were bred with a red-eyed female, their progeny were all red-eyed. A second-generation cross produced white-eyed males—a sex-linked recessive trait, the gene for which Morgan named white. Morgan also discovered a pink-eyed mutant that showed a different pattern of inheritance. In a paper published in Science in 1911, he concluded that (1) some traits were sex-linked, (2) the trait was probably carried on one of the sex chromosomes, and (3) other genes were probably carried on specific chromosomes as well.

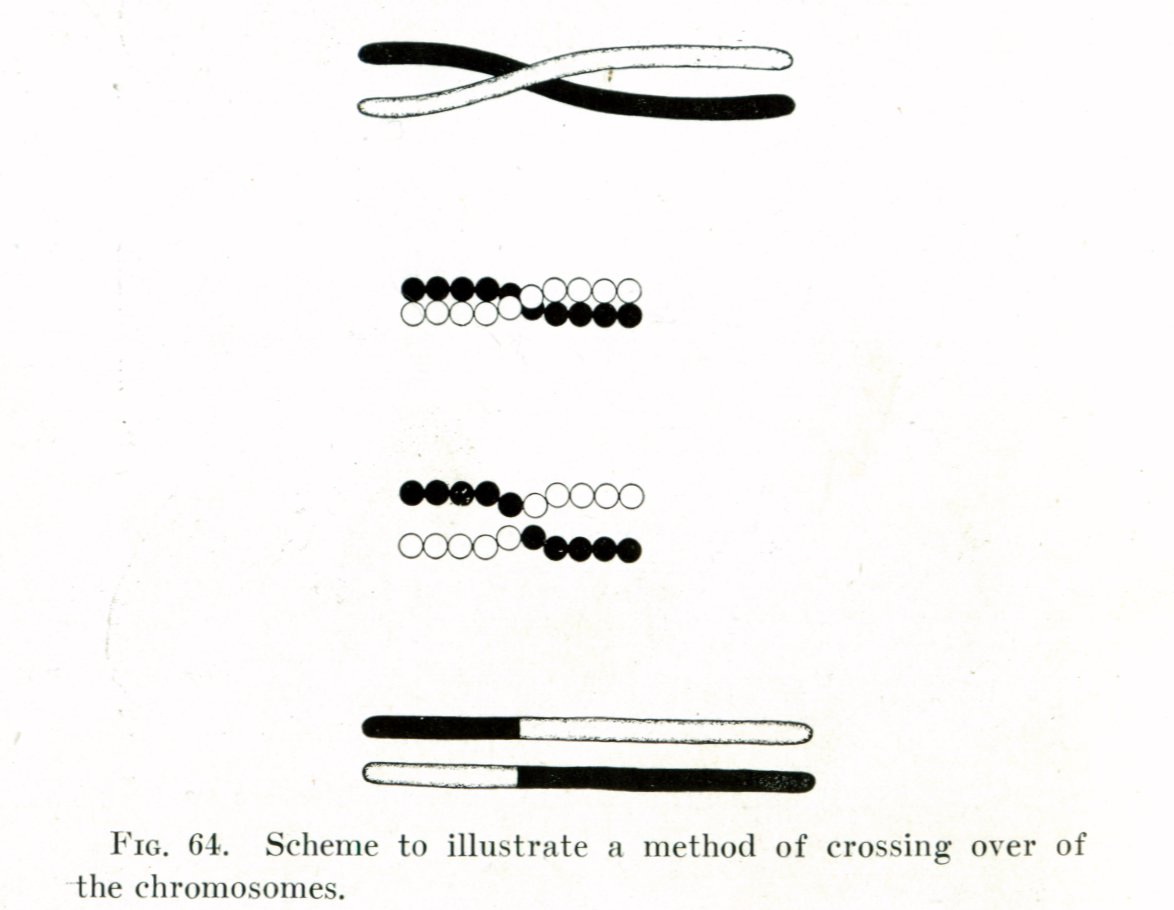
Morgan's illustration of crossing over, from his 1916 A Critique of the Theory of Evolution

First genetic map (Sturtevant, 1913). It shows 6 sex-linked genes.

Morgan and his students counted the mutant characteristics of thousands of fruit flies and studied their inheritance. A miniature-wing mutant on the sex chromosome sometimes sorted independently of the white-eye mutation. This led Morgan to the idea of genetic linkage and to hypothesize the phenomenon of crossing over. He relied on the discovery of Frans Alfons Janssens, a Belgian professor at the University of Leuven, who described the phenomenon in 1909 and had called it chiasmatypy. Morgan proposed that the amount of crossing over between linked genes differs and that crossover frequency might indicate the distance separating genes on the chromosome. The later English geneticist J. B. S. Haldane suggested that the unit of measurement for linkage be called the morgan. Morgan's student Alfred Sturtevant developed the first genetic map in 1913.

Thomas Hunt Morgan's Drosophila melanogaster genetic linkage map. This was the first successful gene mapping work and provides important evidence for the chromosome theory of inheritance. The map shows the relative positions of allelic characteristics on the second Drosophila chromosome. The distance between the genes (map units) is equal to the percentage of crossing-over events that occurs between different alleles.

In 1915 Morgan, Sturtevant, Calvin Bridges and H. J. Muller wrote the seminal book The Mechanism of Mendelian Heredity. Geneticist Curt Stern called the book "the fundamental textbook of the new genetics".

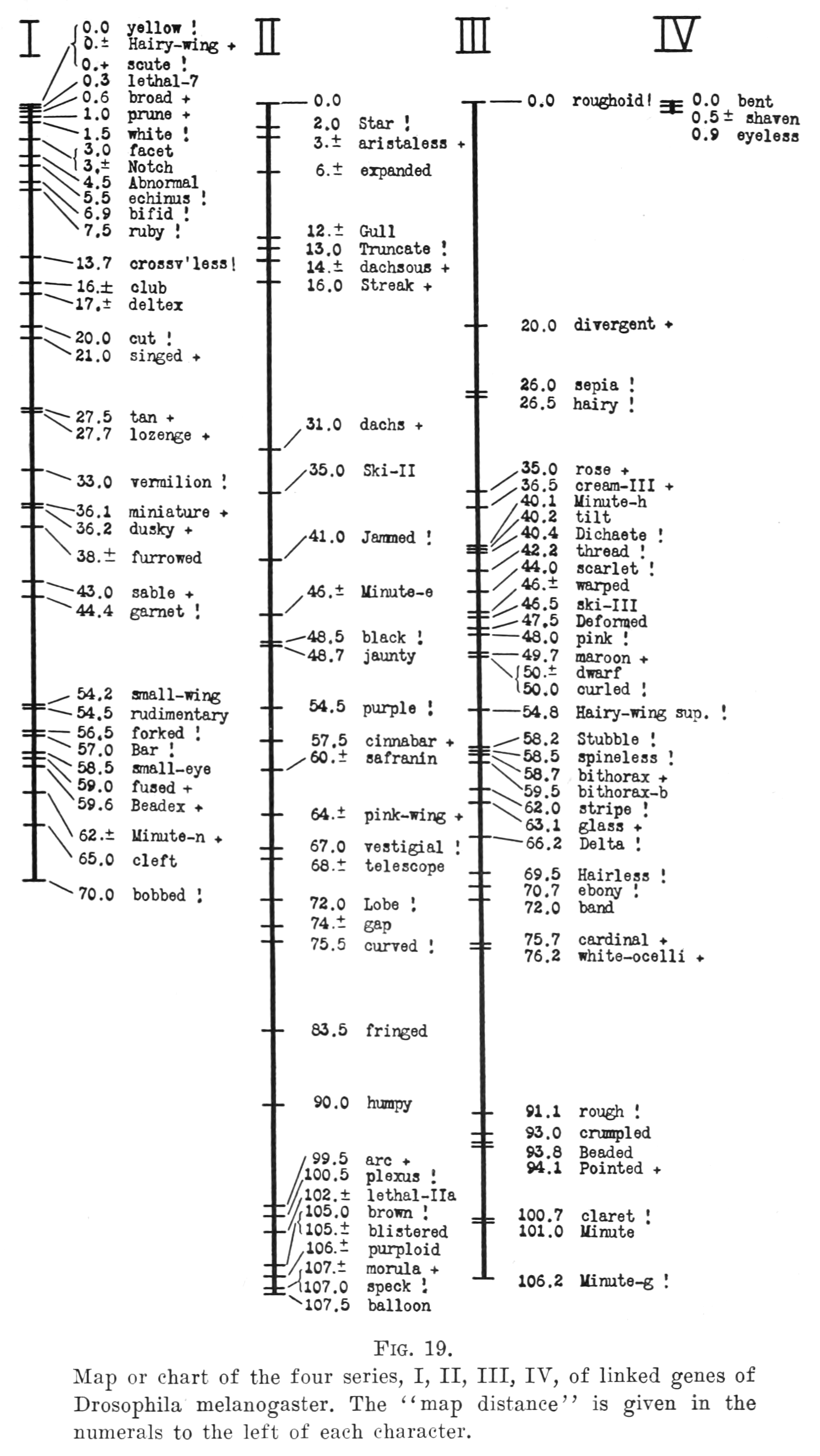
Genetic map of drosophila, published in The theory of the gene 1926 edition.

In the following years, most biologists came to accept the Mendelian-chromosome theory, which was independently proposed by Walter Sutton and Theodor Boveri in 1902/1903, and elaborated and expanded by Morgan and his students. Garland Allen characterized the post-1915 period as one of normal science, in which "The activities of 'geneticists' were aimed at further elucidation of the details and implications of the Mendelian-chromosome theory developed between 1910 and 1915." But, the details of the increasingly complex theory, as well as the concept of the gene and its physical nature, were still controversial. Critics such as W. E. Castle pointed to contrary results in other organisms, suggesting that genes interact with each other, while Richard Goldschmidt and others thought there was no compelling reason to view genes as discrete units residing on chromosomes.

Because of Morgan's dramatic success with Drosophila, many other labs throughout the world took up fruit fly genetics. Columbia became the center of an informal exchange network, through which promising mutant Drosophila strains were transferred from lab to lab; Drosophila became one of the first and for some time the most widely used, model organisms. Morgan's group remained highly productive, but Morgan largely withdrew from doing fly work and gave his lab members considerable freedom in designing and carrying out their own experiments.

He returned to embryology and worked to encourage the spread of genetics research to other organisms and the spread of mechanistic experimental approach (Enwicklungsmechanik) to all biological fields. After 1915, he also became a strong critic of the growing eugenics movement, which adopted genetic approaches in support of racist views of "improving" humanity.

Morgan's fly-room at Columbia became world-famous, and he found it easy to attract funding and visiting academics. In 1927 after 25 years at Columbia, and nearing the age of retirement, he received an offer from George Ellery Hale to establish a school of biology in California.

=== Caltech ===
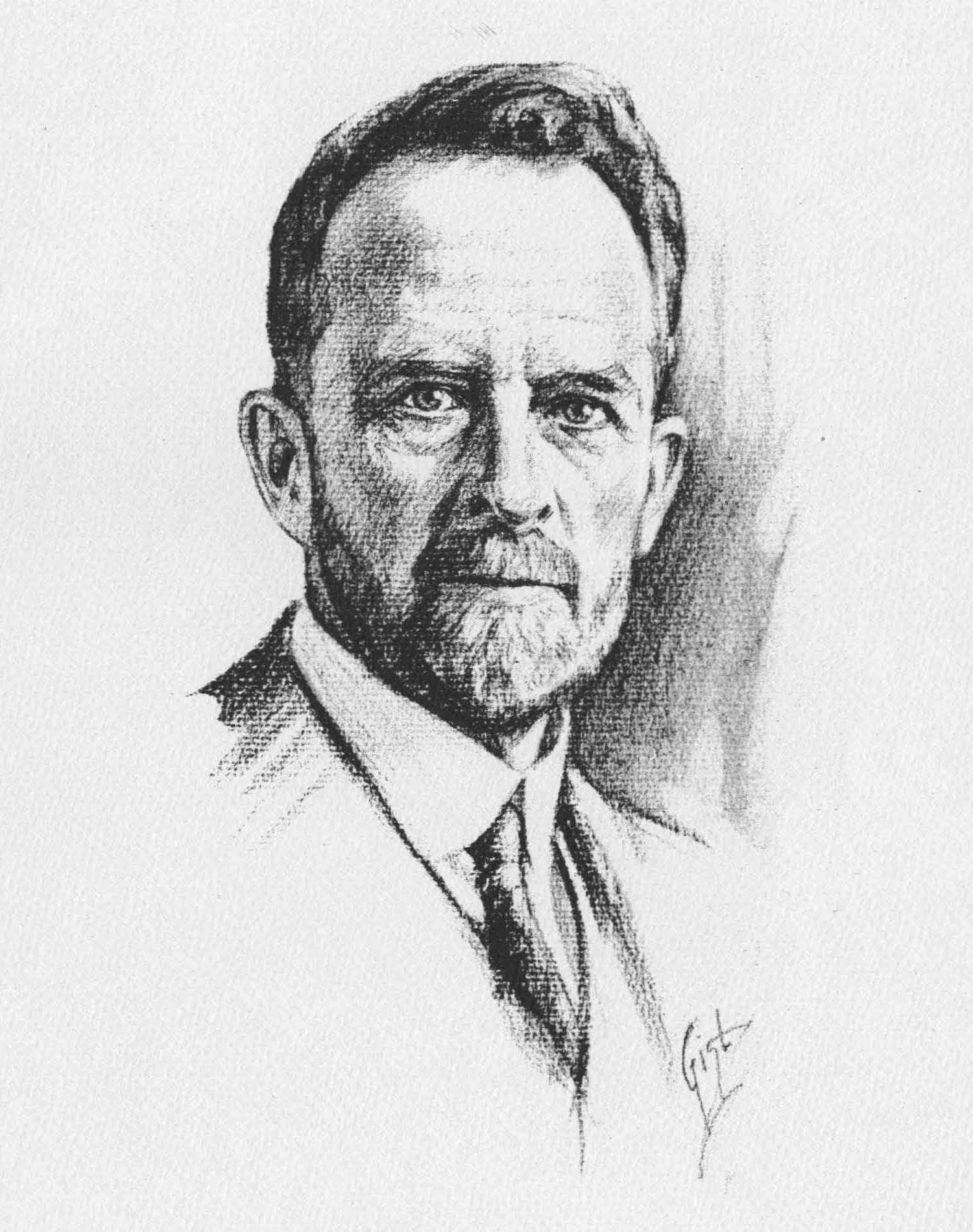
1931 drawing of Thomas Hunt Morgan

In 1928 Morgan joined the faculty of the California Institute of Technology where he remained until his retirement 14 years later in 1942.

Morgan moved to California to head the Division of Biology at the California Institute of Technology in 1928. In establishing the biology division, Morgan wanted to distinguish his program from those offered by Johns Hopkins and Columbia, with research focused on genetics and evolution; experimental embryology; physiology; biophysics, and biochemistry. He was also instrumental in the establishment of the Marine Laboratory at Corona del Mar. He wanted to attract the best people to the Division at Caltech, so he took Bridges, Sturtevant, Jack Shultz and Albert Tyler from Columbia and took on Theodosius Dobzhansky as an international research fellow. More scientists came to work in the Division including George Beadle, Boris Ephrussi, Edward L. Tatum, Linus Pauling, Frits Went, Edward B. Lewis, and Sidney W. Byance with his reputation, Morgan held numerous prestigious positions in American science organizations. From 1927 to 1931 Morgan served as the President of the National Academy of Sciences; in 1930 he was the President of the American Association for the Advancement of Science; and in 1932 he chaired the Sixth International Congress of Genetics in Ithaca, New York. In 1933 Morgan was awarded the Nobel Prize in Physiology or Medicine; he had been nominated in 1919 and 1930 for the same work. As an acknowledgment of the group nature of his discovery, he gave his prize money to Bridges, Sturtevant, and his own children. Morgan declined to attend the awards ceremony in 1933, instead attending in 1934. The 1933 rediscovery of the giant polytene chromosomes in the salivary gland of Drosophila may have influenced his choice. Until that point, the lab's results had been inferred from phenotypic results, the visible polytene chromosome enabled them to confirm their results on a physical basis. Morgan's Nobel acceptance speech entitled "The Contribution of Genetics to Physiology and Medicine" downplayed the contribution genetics could make to medicine beyond genetic counseling. In 1939 he was awarded the Copley Medal by the Royal Society.

He received two extensions of his contract at Caltech, but eventually retired in 1942, becoming a professor and chairman emeritus. George Beadle returned to Caltech to replace Morgan as chairman of the department in 1946. Although he had retired, Morgan kept offices across the road from the Division and continued laboratory work. In his retirement, he returned to the questions of sexual differentiation, regeneration, and embryology.

== Death ==
Morgan had throughout his life suffered from a chronic duodenal ulcer. In 1945, at age 79, he experienced a severe heart attack and died from a ruptured artery.

On August 30, 2025, the family of Thomas Hunt Morgan and his wife Lilian Vaughan Morgan transferred their cremains from the Mountain View Mausoleum in Altadena, California to the Woods Hole Community Cemetery in Woods Hole, Massachusetts. The community cemetery is managed by the Church of the Messiah in Woods Hole.

== Morgan and evolution ==
Morgan was interested in evolution throughout his life. He wrote his thesis on the phylogeny of sea spiders (pycnogonids) and wrote four books about evolution. In Evolution and Adaptation (1903), he argued the anti-Darwinist position that selection could never produce wholly new species by acting on slight individual differences. He rejected Darwin's theory of sexual selection and the Neo-Lamarckian theory of the inheritance of acquired characters. Morgan was not the only scientist attacking natural selection. The period 1875–1925 has been called 'The eclipse of Darwinism'. After discovering many small stable heritable mutations in Drosophila, Morgan gradually changed his mind. The relevance of mutations for evolution is that only characteristics that are inherited can result in evolution. Since Morgan solved the problem of heredity (1915), he was in a unique position to examine critically Darwin's theory of natural selection.

In A Critique of the Theory of Evolution (1916), Morgan discussed questions such as: "Does selection play any role in evolution? How can selection produce anything new? Is selection no more than the elimination of the unfit? Is selection a creative force?" After eliminating some misunderstandings and explaining in detail the new science of Mendelian heredity and its chromosomal basis, Morgan concludes, "the evidence shows clearly that the characters of wild animals and plants, as well as those of domesticated races, are inherited both in the wild and in domesticated forms according to the Mendel's Law". "Evolution has taken place by the incorporation into the race of those mutations that are beneficial to the life and reproduction of the organism". Injurious mutations have practically no chance of becoming established. Far from rejecting evolution, as the title of his 1916 book may suggest, Morgan laid the foundation of the science of genetics. He also laid the theoretical foundation for the mechanism of evolution: natural selection. Heredity was a central plank of Darwin's theory of natural selection, but Darwin could not provide a working theory of heredity. Darwinism could not progress without a correct theory of genetics. By creating that foundation, Morgan contributed to the neo-Darwinian synthesis, despite his criticism of Darwin at the beginning of his career. Much work on the Evolutionary Synthesis remained to be done.

== Awards and honors ==
Morgan left an important legacy in genetics. Some of Morgan's students from Columbia and Caltech went on to win their own Nobel Prizes, including George Wells Beadle and Hermann Joseph Muller. Nobel prize winner Eric Kandel has written of Morgan, "Much as Darwin's insights into the evolution of animal species first gave coherence to nineteenth-century biology as a descriptive science, Morgan's findings about genes and their location on chromosomes helped transform biology into an experimental science."

- Johns Hopkins awarded Morgan an honorary LL.D. and the University of Kentucky awarded him an honorary Ph.D.
- He was elected Member of the National Academy of Sciences in 1909.
- He was elected to the American Philosophical Society in 1915.
- He was a member of the American Association for Anatomy.
- He was elected a Foreign Member of the Royal Society (ForMemRS) in 1919
- In 1924 Morgan received the Darwin Medal.
- He was elected to the American Academy of Arts and Sciences in 1928.
- The Thomas Hunt Morgan School of Biological Sciences at the University of Kentucky is named for him.
- The Genetics Society of America annually awards the Thomas Hunt Morgan Medal, named in his honor, to one of its members who has made a significant contribution to the science of genetics.
- Thomas Hunt Morgan's discovery was illustrated on a 1989 stamp issued in Sweden, showing the discoveries of eight Nobel Prize-winning geneticists.
- A junior high school in the Shoreline School District was named for Morgan until 1986.

== Personal life ==
On June 4, 1904, Morgan married Lillian Vaughan Sampson (1870–1952), who had entered graduate school in biology at Bryn Mawr the same year Morgan joined the faculty; she put aside her scientific work for 16 years of their marriage when they had four children. Later she contributed significantly to Morgan's Drosophila work. One of their four children (one boy and three girls) was Isabel Morgan (1911–1996) (Marr. Mountain), who became a virologist at Johns Hopkins, specializing in polio research. Morgan was an atheist.

== See also ==
- Mildred Hoge Richards, pupil
