= Katherine Brehme Warren =

American biologist

Katherine "Kitty" Brehme Warren (1909–1991) was an American geneticist and scientific editor known for her work at Cold Spring Harbor Laboratory.

== Early life and education ==
Warren was born Katherine Suydam Brehme in New York City in 1909, to parents Almira and Franklin Brehme. She graduated from Barnard College in 1930 and earned a doctorate in zoology from Columbia University. She married fellow scientist Charles O. Warren in 1939.

== Cold Spring Harbor Laboratory ==
Brehme was a student of Calvin Bridges and after his death the Assistant Director of Cold Spring Harbor Laboratory. Milislav Demerec pushed for Warren's appointment to complete some of Bridges's unfinished work. The project was supported by a fellowship from the Carnegie Institution of Washington and the completed work, The Mutants of Drosophila melanogaster (1944), became a classic in the field. For decades "Bridges and Brehme" served as an essential reference for geneticists and later formed the backbone of subsequent scholarship and, ultimately, the online resource FlyBase.

Warren served as the executive director of the Cold Spring Harbor Symposia on Quantitative Biology. As Symposia editor from 1941-1958, she was responsible for manuscript preparation, proofreading, and indexing. In addition to her serious editorial duties, she introduced a nonexistent scholar, J. C. Foothills of Tennessee Intermountain College, whose name was derived from her favorite expression of frustration: "Jesus Christ in the foothills!"

== Teaching and administration ==
Warren taught biology at Adelphi University, Hofstra University, Cornell University Medical College, and Wellesley College. She later spent a decade as a grants administrator at the National Institutes of Health, retiring in 1971.

== Personal life ==
Warren suspended her teaching career for several years after the birth of her children, but did not interrupt her work with the Cold Spring Harbor Symposia. The couple divorced in 1961, with Warren retaining custody of her three teenage daughters.
