= Temperature-dependent sex determination =

Environmental sex determination by temperature during development

Temperature-dependent sex determination (TSD) is a type of environmental sex determination in which the temperatures experienced during embryonic/larval development determine the sex of the offspring. It is observed in reptiles and teleost fish, with some reports of it occurring in species of shrimp. TSD differs from the chromosomal sex-determination systems common among vertebrates. It is the most studied type of environmental sex determination (ESD). Some other conditions, e.g. density, pH, and environmental background color, are also observed to alter sex ratio, which could be classified either as temperature-dependent sex determination or temperature-dependent sex differentiation, depending on the involved mechanisms. As sex-determining mechanisms, TSD and genetic sex determination (GSD) should be considered in an equivalent manner, which can lead to reconsidering the status of fish species that are claimed to have TSD when submitted to extreme temperatures instead of the temperature experienced during development in the wild, since changes in sex ratio with temperature variation are ecologically and evolutionally relevant.

While TSD has been observed in many reptile and fish species, the genetic differences between sexes and molecular mechanisms of TSD have not been determined. The cortisol-mediated pathway and epigenetic regulatory pathway are thought to be the potential mechanisms involved in TSD.

The eggs are affected by the temperature at which they are incubated during the middle third of embryonic development. This critical period of incubation is known as the thermosensitive period. The specific time of sex-commitment is known due to several authors resolving histological chronology of sex differentiation in the gonads of turtles with TSD.

== Thermosensitive period ==
The thermosensitive, or temperature-sensitive, period is the period during development when sex is irreversibly determined. It is used in reference to species with temperature-dependent sex determination, such as crocodilians and turtles. The TSP typically spans the middle third of incubation with the endpoints defined by embryonic stage when under constant temperatures. The extent of the TSP varies a little among species, and development within the oviducts must be taken into account in species where the embryo is at a relatively late stage of development on egg laying (e.g. many lizards). Temperature pulses during the thermosensitive period are often sufficient to determine sex, but after the TSP, sex is unresponsive to temperature and sex reversal is impossible.

== Types ==
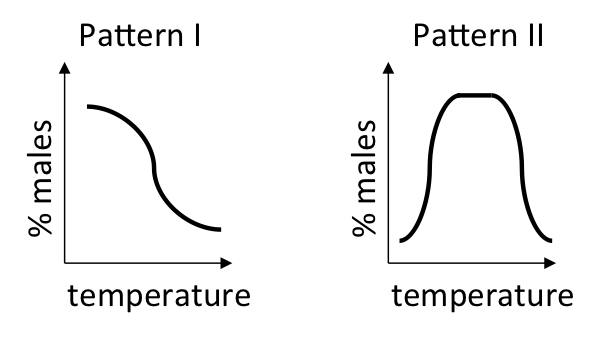
Patterns of temperature-dependent sex determination (TSD) in reptiles. Pattern I in this image actually depicts Pattern IA - which is found in turtles, e.g. Red-eared slider turtles (Trachemys scripta), Olive Ridley sea turtles (Lepidochelys olivacea), or Painted turtles (Chrysemys picta). Pattern II has been found in American alligators (Alligator mississippiensis and Leopard geckos (Eublepharis macularius).

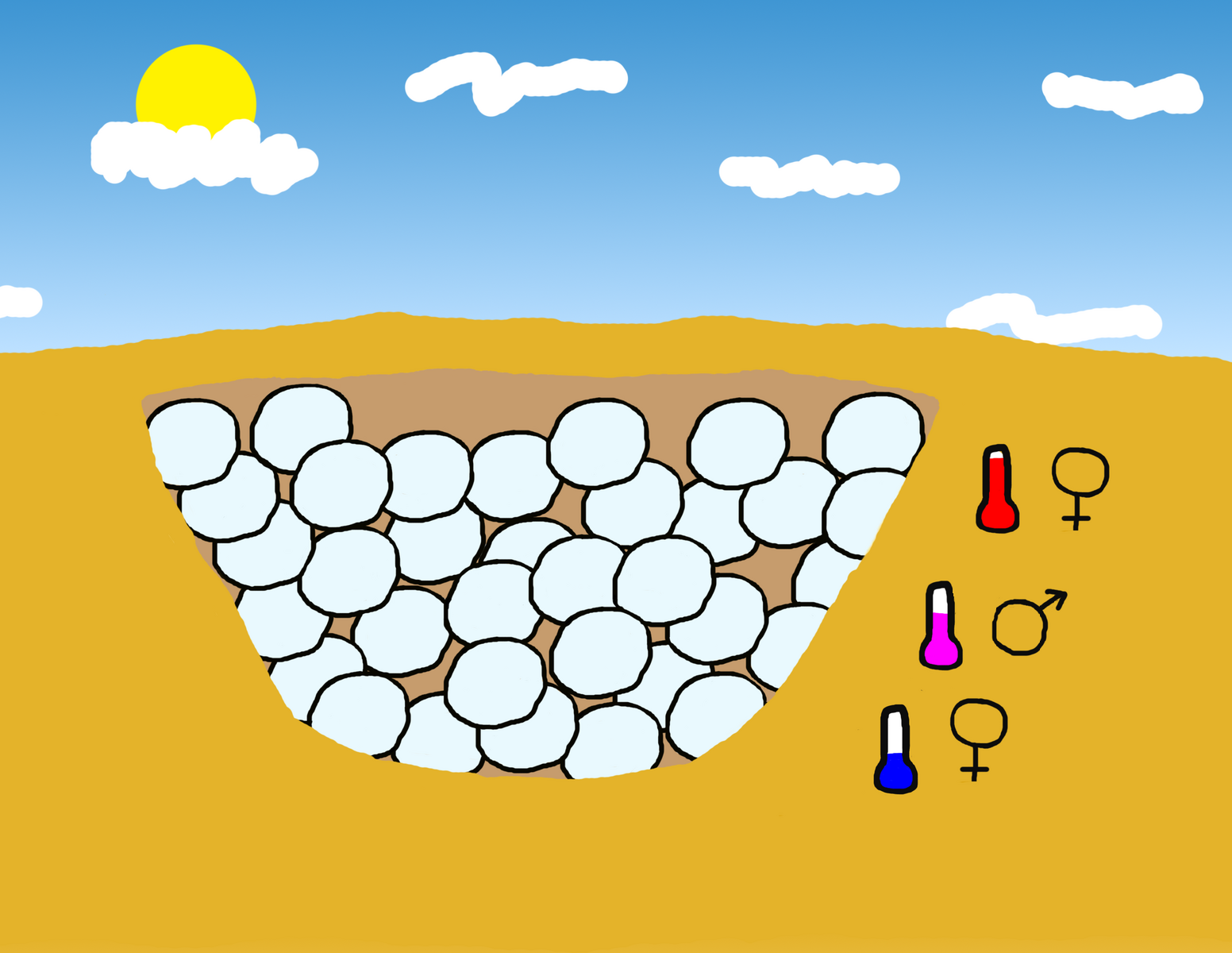
Some reptiles use incubation temperatures to determine sex. In some species, this follows the pattern that eggs in extremely high or low temperatures become female and eggs in medium temperatures become male.

Within the mechanism, two distinct patterns have been discovered and named Pattern I and Pattern II. Pattern I is further divided into IA and IB.

Pattern IA has a single transition zone, where eggs predominantly hatch males if incubated below this temperature zone, and predominantly hatch females if incubated above it. Pattern IA occurs in most turtles, with the transition between male-producing temperatures and female-producing temperatures occurring over a range of temperatures as little as 1–2°C. Pattern IB also has a single transition zone, but females are produced below it and males above it. Pattern IB occurs in multiple fish species and the tuatara.

Pattern II has two transition zones, with males dominating at intermediate temperatures and females dominating at both extremes. Pattern II occurs in some turtles, lizards, and crocodilians. Mixed sex ratios and (more rarely) intersex individuals have been observed at or near the pivotal temperature of sex determination.

It has been proposed that essentially all modes of TSD are actually Pattern II and those that deviate from the expected female-male-female pattern are species whose viable temperature range does not allow for the extreme temperatures needed to pass the second transition zone.

The distinction between chromosomal sex-determination systems and TSD is often blurred because the sex of some species – such as the three-lined skink Bassiana duperreyi and the central bearded dragon Pogona vitticeps – is determined by sex chromosomes, but this is over-ridden by temperatures that are tolerable but extreme. Also, experiments conducted at the pivotal temperature, where temperature is equivocal in its influence, have demonstrated an underlying genetic predisposition to be one sex or the other.

== Examples ==
Temperature-dependent sex determination was first described in Agama agama in 1966 by Madeleine Charnier.

A 2015 study found that hot temperatures altered the expression of the sex chromosomes in Australia's bearded dragon lizards. The lizards were female in appearance and were capable of bearing offspring, despite having the ZZ chromosomes usually associated with male lizards.

In 2018, a team of Chinese and American researchers showed that the histone H3 lysine 27 (H3K27) demethylase KDM6B (JMJD3), an epigenetic modifier, activates male development in red-eared slider turtles by binding to the promoter of the dominant male gene [DMRT1]. Knocking down the expression of this modifier at 26 °C triggers male-to-female sex reversal in most of the surviving embryos.

Research from 2020 identified the timing of gonadal commitment in the American alligator to understand the effects of estrogen-signaling in TSD. It was determined that a main factor in gonadal fate is the level of testicular genes and estrogen signaling. The study found that critical commitment in testicular development is during stage 24-26, which is later than a known TSP for promoting males in TSD. Additionally, earlier estrogen signaling induced development of parts of the ovary.

== Hormones in TSD systems ==
Synergism between temperature and hormones has also been identified in these systems. Administering estradiol at male-producing temperatures generates females that are physiologically identical to temperature-produced females. The reverse experiment, males produced at female temperatures, only occurs when a nonaromatizable testosterone or an aromatase inhibitor is administered, indicating that the enzyme responsible for conversion of testosterone to estradiol, aromatase, plays a role in female development. Nonetheless, the mechanisms for TSD are still relatively unknown, but in some ways, TSD resembles genetic sex determination (GSD), particularly in regards to the effects of aromatase in each process. In some fish species, aromatase is in both the ovaries of female organisms who underwent TSD and those who underwent GSD, with no less than 85% of the coding sequences of each aromatase being identical, showing that aromatase is not unique to TSD and suggesting that there must be another factor in addition to it that is also affecting TSD.

Hormones and temperature show signs of acting in the same pathway, in that less hormone is required to produce a sexual shift as the incubation conditions near the pivotal temperature. It has been proposed that temperature acts on genes coding for such steroidogenic enzymes, and testing of homologous GSD pathways has provided a genic starting point. Yet, the genetic sexual determination pathway in TSD turtles is poorly understood and the controlling mechanism for male or female commitment has not been identified.

While sex hormones have been observed to be influenced by temperature, thus potentially altering sexual phenotypes, specific genes in the gonadal differentiation pathway display temperature influenced expression. In some species, such important sex-determining genes as DMRT1 and those involved in the Wnt signalling pathway could potentially be implicated as genes which provide a mechanism (opening the door for selective forces) for the evolutionary development of TSD. Aromatase has also been shown to play a role in certain tumor development.

== Adaptive significance ==
The adaptive significance of TSD is currently not well understood. One possible explanation that TSD is common in amniotes is phylogenetic inertia – TSD is the ancestral condition in this clade and is simply maintained in extant lineages because it is currently adaptively neutral or nearly so. Indeed, recent phylogenetic comparative analyses imply a single origin for TSD in most amniotes around 300 million years, with the re-evolution of TSD in squamates and turtles after they had independently developed GSD. Consequently, the adaptive significance of TSD in all but the most recent origins of TSD may have been obscured by the passage of deep time, with TSD potentially being maintained in many amniote clades simply because it works 'well enough' (i.e. has no overall fitness costs along the lines of the phylogenetic inertia explanation).

Other work centers on a 1977 theoretical model (the Charnov–Bull model), predicted that selection should favour TSD over chromosome-based systems when "the developmental environment differentially influences male versus female fitness"; this theoretical model was empirically validated thirty years later but the generality of this hypothesis in reptiles is questioned. This hypothesis is supported by the persistence of TSD in certain populations of spotted skink (Niveoscincus ocellatus), a small lizard in Tasmania, where it is advantageous to have females early in the season. The warmth early in the season ensures female-biased broods that then have more time to grow and reach maturity and possibly reproduce before they experience their first winter, thereby increasing fitness of the individual.

In support of the Charnov and Bull hypothesis, Warner and Shine (2008) showed confidently that incubation temperature influences males' reproductive success differently than females in Jacky Dragon lizards (Amphibolurus muricatus) by treating the eggs with chemicals that interfere with steroid hormone biosynthesis. These chemicals block the conversion of testosterone to estradiol during development so each sex offspring can be produced at all temperatures. They found that hatching temperatures that naturally produce each sex maximized fitness of each sex, which provides the substantial empirical evidence in support of the Charnov & Bull model for reptiles.

Spencer and Janzen (2014) found further support for the Charnov-Bull model by incubating painted turtles (Chrysemys picta) at different temperatures and measuring various characteristics indicative of fitness. The turtles were incubated at temperatures that produce solely males, both sexes, and solely females. Spencer and Janzen (2014) found that hatchlings from mixed-sex nests were less energy efficient and grew less than their same-sex counterparts incubated in single-sex producing temperatures. Hatchlings from single-sex producing temperatures also had higher first-year survivorship than the hatchlings from the temperature that produces both sexes. TSD may be advantageous and selected for in turtles, as embryo energy efficiency and hatchling size are optimized for each sex at single-sex incubation temperatures and are indicative of first-year survivorship. This suggests that natural selection would favor TSD, as TSD may enhance the fitness of offspring.

An alternative hypothesis of adaptive significance was proposed by Bulmer and Bull in 1982 and supported by the work of Pen et al. (2010). They conjectured that disruptive selection produced by variation in the environment could result in an evolutionary transition from ESD to GSD. Pen et al. (2010) addresses evolutionary divergence in SDMs via natural selection on sex ratios. Studying the spotted skink, they observed that the highland population was not affected by temperature, yet, there was a negative correlation between annual temperature and cohort sex ratios in the lowlands. The highlands are colder with a higher magnitude of annual temperature fluctuation and a shorter activity season, delaying maturity, thus GSD is favored so sex ratios are not skewed. However, in the lowlands, temperatures are more constant and a longer activity season allows for favorable conditions for TSD. They concluded that this differentiation in climate causes divergent selection on regulatory elements in the sex-determining network allowing for the emergence of sex chromosomes in the highlands.

=== Climate change effects ===
Climate change presents a unique threat in species influenced by temperature-dependent sex determination by skewing sex ratios and population decline. The warming of the habitats of species exhibiting TSD are beginning to affect their behavior and may soon start affecting their physiology. Many species (with Pattern IA and II) have begun to nest earlier and earlier in the year to preserve the sex ratio. The three traits of pivotal temperature (the temperature at which the sex ratio is 50%), maternal nest-site choice, and nesting phenology have been identified as the key traits of TSD that can change, and of these, only the pivotal temperature is significantly heritable, this would have to increase by 27 standard deviations to compensate for a 4 °C temperature increase. It is likely that climate change will outpace the ability of many TSD animals to adapt, and many will likely go extinct. However, there is evidence that during climatic extremes, changes in the sex determining mechanism itself (to GSD) are selected for, particularly in the highly-mutable turtles. It has also been proposed that sea turtles may be able to use TSD to their advantage in a warming climate. When the offspring viability is decreased due to increased temperatures, they are able to use the coadaptation between sex ratio and survivability to increase the production of female offspring. This allows sea turtles to maintain populations and could increase their resiliency to climate change.

== See also ==
- Sex-determination system
