= Madeleine Charnier =

French zoologist

- Born: 15 June 1919; Lille, France
- Died: 9 July 2002 (aged 83); Nice, France
- Known for: Discovery of temperature-dependent sex determination
- Partner: Marcel Robert (div. 1953)
- Scientific career
- Fields: Zoology

Madeleine Simonne Charnier (15 June 1919—9 July 2002) was a French zoologist. She is known for having first described temperature-dependent sex determination in 1966.

== Biography ==
Charnier's mother was a mathematics professor.

Charnier received her license in science around 1935 at the Faculty of Sciences in Paris. She moved to Africa around 1945 to join her brother: first to Kaolack, Senegal, then to Cotonou, Dahomey (now Benin), then to Dakar, Senegal at the end of the 1940s. In 1953, she divorced her husband, Marcel Robert. That year, she was hired at the university library of University of Dakar.

From 1955, Charnier worked at the faculty of medicine in parasitology, and received certificates in coprology and hematology. There, she published her first scientific article on the common agama, which would become her preferred species to research for the next ten years (Charnier and Dutarte 1956).

In 1958, she left the faculty of medicine for the Faculty of Sciences at the University of Dakar. She completed her training in science to join the zoology department of Professor C. Boisson, a specialist in ciliated and opaline protozoa. Charnier also met Claudine and Xavier Mattéi, who were researching the morphology of spermatozoa. She was appointed assistant professor. It was during this period that she published five articles on the embryonic development of the common agama (Charnier 1963;1965;1966b;a;1967), including her article describing temperature-dependent sex determination on this species in 1966. Charnier observed that eggs incubated at a cool temperature produced female hatchlings, while those incubated at a warm temperature produced males, and posited that the sex of the hatchlings was influenced by the temperature. This discovery was not widely recognized internationally for several years as it was published in French. It has now been referenced more than 230 times, making it one of the most cited zoology articles from the 1960s.

Charnier left Senegal in 1968 and abandoned her work on the agama, which was the subject of her thesis which she did not defend. Once in France, she worked with Professor Jean Cachon in Villefranche-sur-Mer. Charnier published another scientific article on the ultrastructural morphology of a siphonophorean parasite (Cachon et al. 1972).

Charnier retired in 1984 in Nice and died in 2002 at the age of 83.

== Legacy ==
Charnier's work on temperature-dependent sex determination opened the door investigating the role of estrogen in determining sex and the implications of global warming on reptiles, as well as to a large number of works on this subject which have implications in the fields of developmental biology, evolution, and ecology.

== Bibliography ==
- Cachon, J., M. Cachon, and M. Charnier. 1972. Ultrastructure du bodonidé Trypanophis grobbeni Poche, parasite des siphonophores. Protistologica 8:223-236.
- Charnier, M. 1963. Action de l'hormone mâle (hexahydrobenzoate de testostérone) sur les femelles d'Agama agama, Saurien. Agamidae. Comptes Rendus des Séances de la Société de Biologie, Paris 157:1470-1472.
- Charnier, M. 1965. Le cycle sexuel chez le lézard male Agama agama (Reptilia, Lacertilien) dans la région de Dakar. Annales de la Faculté des Sciences de Dakar 18:33-59.
- Charnier, M. 1966a. Action d'une hormone femelle sur le tractus genital des mâles adultes du lézard Agama agama (Lacertilian, Agamidae). Comptes Rendus des Séances de la Société de Biologie 159:1822-1825.
- Charnier, M. 1966b. Action de la température sur la sex-ratio chez l'embryon d'Agama agama (Agamidae, Lacertilien). Comptes Rendus des Séances de la Société de Biologie, Paris 160:620-622. scanned version of the article
- Charnier, M. 1967. Le développement embryonnaire de l'appareil genital du lézard Agama agama. Annales de la Faculté des Sciences, Université de Dakar 20:23-32.
- Charnier, M., and J. P. Dutarte. 1956. Changement histophysiologique de la thyroïde des lézards de la région de Dakar durant la période préhibernatoire. Comptes Rendus des Séances de la Société de Biologie, Paris 150:1387-1388.
