= Trade-off =

Situational decision

A trade-off (or tradeoff) is a situational decision that involves diminishing or losing on quality, quantity, or property of a set or design in return for gains in other aspects. In simple terms, a tradeoff is where one thing increases, and another must decrease. Tradeoffs stem from limitations of many origins, including simple physics – for instance, only a certain volume of objects can fit into a given space, so a full container must remove some items to accept any more, and vessels can carry a few large items or multiple small items. Tradeoffs also commonly refer to different configurations of a single item, such as the tuning of strings on a guitar to enable different notes to be played, as well as an allocation of time and attention towards different tasks.

The concept of a tradeoff suggests a tactical or strategic choice made with full comprehension of the advantages and disadvantages of each setup. An economic example is the decision to invest in stocks, which are risky but carry great potential return, versus bonds, which are generally safer but with lower potential returns.

== Theoretical description ==
The theoretical description of trade-offs involves the Pareto frontier.

== Examples ==
The concept of a trade-off is often used to describe situations in everyday life.

=== Economics ===
In economics a trade-off is expressed in terms of the opportunity cost of a particular choice, which is the loss of the most preferred alternative given up. A trade-off, then, involves a sacrifice that must be made to obtain a certain product, service, or experience, rather than others that could be made or obtained using the same required resources. For example, for a person going to a basketball game, their opportunity cost is the loss of the alternative of watching a particular television program at home. If the basketball game occurs during her or his working hours, then the opportunity cost would be several hours of lost work, as they would need to take time off work.

Many factors affect the trade-off environment within a particular country, including the availability of raw materials, a skilled labor force, machinery for producing a product, technology and capital, a market rate to produce that product on a reasonable time scale, and so forth.

A trade-off in economics is often illustrated graphically by a Pareto frontier (named after the economist Vilfredo Pareto), which shows the greatest (or least) amount of one thing that can be attained for each of various given amounts of the other. As an example, in production theory, the trade-off between the output of one good and the output of another is illustrated graphically by the production possibilities frontier. The Pareto frontier is also used in multi-objective optimization. In finance, the capital asset pricing model includes an efficient frontier that shows the highest level of expected return that any portfolio could have given any particular level of risk, as measured by the variance of portfolio return.

=== Opportunity cost ===
An opportunity cost example of trade-offs for an individual would be the decision by a full-time worker to take time off work with a salary of $50,000 to attend medical school with an annual tuition of $30,000 and earning $150,000 as a doctor after 7 years of study. If we assume for the sake of simplicity that the medical school only allows full-time study, then the individual considering stopping work would face a trade-off between not going to medical school and earning $50,000 at work, or going to medical school and losing $50,000 in salary and having to pay $30,000 in tuition but earning $150,000 or more per year after 7 years of study.

=== Trash cans ===
Trash cans that are used inside and then taken out to the street and emptied into a dumpster can be small or large. A large trash can does not need to be taken out to the dumpster so often, but it may become very heavy and difficult to move when full. The choice of big versus small trash can is a trade-off between the frequency of needing to take out the trash and ease of use.

In the case of food waste, a second trade-off presents itself. Large trash cans are more likely to sit for a long time in the kitchen, leading to the food decomposing and a nasty odor. A small trash can will likely need to be taken out to the dumpster more often, thus greatly reducing or eliminating the odor. Of course, a user of a large trash can could simply carry the can outside frequently, but the larger can would be more cumbersome to take out often, and the user would have to think more about when to take the can out.

=== Mittens ===
In cold climates, mittens in which all the fingers are in the same compartment work well to keep the hands warm, but this arrangement also confines finger movement and prevents the full range of hand function. Gloves, with their separate fingers, do not have this drawback, but they do not keep the fingers as warm as mittens do. As such, with mittens and gloves, the trade-off is warmth versus dexterity. Similarly, warm coats are often bulky and impede the wearer's freedom of movement. Thin coats give the wearer more freedom of movement, but they are not as warm as a thicker coat would be.

=== Music ===
When copying music from compact discs to a computer, lossy compression formats, such as MP3, are used routinely to save hard disk space, but some information is lost resulting in lower sound quality. Lossless compression schemes, such as FLAC or ALAC take much more disk space, but do not affect sound quality.

=== Cars ===
Large cars can carry many people, and since they have larger crumple zones, they may be safer in an accident. However, they also tend to be heavy (and often not very aerodynamic) and thus usually have relatively poor fuel economy. Small cars like the Smart Car can only carry two people, and being lightweight, they are more fuel-efficient. At the same time, the smaller size and weight of small cars mean that they have smaller crumple zones, which means occupants are less protected in case of an accident. In addition, if a small car has an accident with a larger, heavier car, the occupants of the smaller car will fare more poorly. Thus, car size (large versus small) involves multiple tradeoffs regarding passenger capacity, accident safety, and fuel economy.

=== Athletics ===
In athletics, sprint running demands different physical attributes from running a marathon. Accordingly, the two contests have distinct events in such competitions as the Olympics, and each pursuit features distinct teams of athletes. Whether a professional runner is better suited to marathon running versus sprinting is a trade-off based on the runner's morphology and physiology (e.g., variation in muscle fiber type), as well as the runner's individual interest, preference, and other motivational factors. Sports recruiters are mindful of these trade-offs as they decide what role a prospective athlete would best suit on a team.

=== Biology ===
In biology, several types of tradeoffs have been recognized. Most simply, a tradeoff occurs when a beneficial change in one trait is linked to a detrimental change in another trait. In environmental resource management, trade-offs occur among different targets. For example, these occur among biodiversity conservation, carbon sequestration and distributive equity in the distribution of funds of the program for Reducing Emissions from Deforestation and forest Degradation (REDD+), as maximizing one of these targets implies reducing the outcomes in the other two targets.

The term is also used widely in an evolutionary context, in which case the processes of natural selection and sexual selection are referred to as the ultimate decisive factors. In biology, the concepts of tradeoffs and constraints are often closely related.

=== Demography ===
In demography, tradeoff examples may include maturity, fecundity, parental care, parity, senescence, and mate choice. For example, the higher the fecundity (number of offspring), the lower the parental care that each offspring will receive. Parental care as a function of fecundity would show a negative-sloping linear graph. A related phenomenon, known as demographic compensation, arises when the different components of species life cycles (survival, growth, fecundity, etc.) show negative correlations across the distribution ranges. For example, survival may be higher towards the northern edge of the distribution, while fecundity or growth increases towards the south, leading to a compensation that allows the species to persist along an environmental gradient. Contrasting trends in life cycle components may arise through tradeoffs in resource allocation, but also through independent but opposite responses to environmental conditions.

=== Engineering ===
Tradeoffs are important in engineering. For example, in electrical engineering, negative feedback is used in amplifiers to trade gain for other desirable properties, such as improved bandwidth, stability of the gain and/or bias point, noise immunity, and reduction of nonlinear distortion. Similarly, tradeoffs are used to maximize power efficiency in medical devices whilst guaranteeing the required measurement quality.

=== Computer science ===
In computer science, tradeoffs are viewed as a tool of the trade. A program can often run faster if it uses more memory (a space–time tradeoff). Consider the following examples:

- By compressing an image, you can reduce transmission time/costs at the expense of CPU time to perform the compression and decompression. Depending on the compression method, this may also involve the tradeoff of a loss in image quality.
- By using a lookup table, you may be able to reduce CPU time at the expense of space to hold the table, e.g. to determine the parity of a byte you can either look at each bit individually (using shifts and masks), or use a 256-entry table giving the parity for each possible bit-pattern, or combine the upper and lower nibbles and use a 16-entry table.
- For some situations (e.g. string manipulation), a compiler may be able to use inline code for greater speed, or call run-time routines for reduced memory; the user of the compiler should be able to indicate whether speed or space is more important.

The Software Engineering Institute has a specific method for analyzing tradeoffs, called the Architecture Tradeoff Analysis Method (ATAM).

=== Board games ===
Strategy board games often involve tradeoffs: for example, in chess you might trade a pawn for an improved position. In a worst-case scenario, a chess player might even trade off the loss of a valuable piece (even the Queen) to protect the King. In Go, you might trade thickness for influence.

=== Ethics ===
Ethics often involves competing for interests that must be traded off against each other, such as the interests of different people, or different principles (e.g. is it ethical to use information resulting from inhumane or illegal experiments to treat disease today?)

=== Medicine ===
In medicine, patients and physicians are often faced with difficult decisions involving tradeoffs. One example is localized prostate cancer, where patients need to weigh the possibility of a prolonged life expectancy against possible stressful or unpleasant treatment side-effects (patient trade-off).

=== Government ===
Governmental tradeoffs are among the most controversial political and social difficulties of any time. All of politics can be viewed as a series of tradeoffs based upon which core values are most core to most people or politicians. Political campaigns also involve tradeoffs, as when attack ads may energize the political base but alienate undecided voters.

=== Work schedules ===
With work schedules, employees will often use a tradeoff of "9/80" where an 80-hour work period is compressed into a narrow group of 9 nearly-9-hour working days over the traditional 10 8-hour working days, allowing the employee to take every second Friday off.

== Assessment tools ==
=== Trade-off table ===
A trade-off table is a project management quality tool that visually juxtaposes alternatives.

Trade-off table
Parameter	Option 1	Option 2	Option 3
A			
B			
C			

== See also ==
- Architecture tradeoff analysis method
- Bias–variance tradeoff
- Biological constraints
- Carrier's constraint
- Cost-benefit analysis
- Detection error tradeoff
- Economy (linguistics)
- Evolutionary medicine
- Evolutionary physiology
- Evolutionary tradeoff
- Negotiation
- Paradox
- Patient trade-off
- Risk assessment
- Risk management
- Space–time tradeoff
- Systems theory
- Time-trade-off
- Trade-off theory of capital structure
- Williamson trade-off model
- Indifference curve
