= Evolutionary tradeoff =

When evolution cannot enhance one trait without diminishing another

In evolutionary biology, an evolutionary tradeoff is a situation in which evolution cannot advance one part of a biological system without distressing another part of it. In this context, tradeoffs refer to the process through which a trait increases in fitness at the expense of decreased fitness in another trait. A much agreed-on theory on what causes evolutionary tradeoffs is that due to resource limitations (e.g. energy, habitat/space, time) the simultaneous optimization of two traits cannot be achieved. Another commonly accepted cause of evolutionary tradeoffs is that the characteristics of increasing the fitness in one trait negatively affects the fitness of another trait. This negative relationship is found in traits that are antagonistically pleiotropic (one gene responsible for multiple traits that are not all beneficial to the organism) or when linkage disequilibrium is present (non-random association of alleles at different loci during the gametic phase).

== Background and theory ==
The general concept behind evolutionary tradeoffs is that in order to increase fitness (or function) in one trait it must come at the expense of the decrease in fitness/function of another trait. The 'Y-model' states that, within an individual, any two traits are determined by resources from a common pool. Although a useful tool that has provided valuable insight, the 'Y-model' has been oversimplified in much of the literature. Researchers have made different mathematical expansions to the 'Y model' in order to gain insights about evolutionary tradeoffs.

An important point that many authors make when discussing the concept of how tradeoffs affect evolutionary change is the ambiguous use of the word 'constraint'. The term 'constraint' has two meanings: hindering (slowing), but not stopping evolution in particular directions, or that there are certain evolutionary trajectories that are not available to selection. The distinction between the two senses of the word is important because according to the first definition all character states, or forms, are possible, where as according to the later definition some character states are unattainable. When discussing evolutionary tradeoffs it is important to make clear which sense of the word is being used.

== Life history examples ==
Evolutionary tradeoffs can be present in a form called life history tradeoffs, which can be defined as the decrease in fitness (essentially, lifetime reproductive success) caused by one life history trait as a result of the increase in fitness caused by a different life history trait. Life history traits are traits closely linked to fitness, such as traits associated with growth rate, body size, stress response, timing of reproduction, offspring quantity/quality, longevity and dispersal.

A classic example of life history tradeoffs is a negative relationship between the age and the size of maturity. Growth rates are negatively correlated with maximal size so that the fastest growing individuals produce the smallest adults and slowly growing individuals produce large adults. Another classic example is the tradeoff between energy investment in reproduction versus survival. If an organism has a set amount of energy that must be allocated among all the functions that individual performs, then the more energy is allocated to reproduction (increased sexual activity/size of reproductive organs), the less is available for survival (longevity/weapon size). For example, through experimental manipulation in the lab researchers were able to see that an increase in reproductive activity is correlated with a decrease in longevity in the male fruit fly (Drosophila melanogaster). More evidence of the tradeoff between reproduction and survival comes from a study done on pinnipeds, where both genital length and testes mass are negatively associated with investment in precopulatory weaponry.

Life history tradeoffs can also be thought of in the context of adaptation to a specific environment. The general theory is that increased fitness within a selected environment will cause a loss of fitness in other nonelected environments. Researchers have used experimental evolution to test this theory in Escherichia coli evolved in a 20 °C environment. They were able to see that, although not universal (meaning all individuals showed it), generally there was a decrease in fitness of the evolved E. coli when grown in a 40 °C.

== Human/clinical examples ==
Examples of tradeoffs can also be found in studies involving human subjects. A tradeoff can be seen between growth and immune function in human populations in which energy is a limiting factor. A study conducted on rural Bolivia found that children experiencing an elevated immune response had smaller gains in height than those with a normal level of immune response. This trend was stronger in children between two and five years old, the ages when children experience rapid growth, as well as in children with less fat reserves. A tradeoff has also been observed between growth and reproduction. In a study of pregnant adolescents, researchers observed that less energy was allocated to fetuses of women still growing than those who had completed their growth. Tradeoffs have also been observed in clinical medicine. For example, hormone replacement therapy for post-menopausal women may reduce the risk of ovarian cancer and osteoporosis, but can increase the risk of breast cancer. This can be linked back to the fact that ovarian steroids act as both bone trophic hormones and mitotic stimulants in breast tissue.

== See also ==
- Biological constraints
- Evolutionary medicine
- Evolutionary physiology
- Trade-off
