= SAAM =

SAAM may refer to:

- Smithsonian American Art Museum
- Seattle Asian Art Museum
- Software Architecture Analysis Method
- South Australian Aviation Museum
- Sexual Assault Awareness Month
- Statin-associated autoimmune myopathy
