= Architectural analytics =

Architectural analytics is a field of study focused on discovering and identifying meaningful patterns within architecture. Architectural analytics can include the systematic study of the elements and principles that constitute a building or structure, such as form, function, space planning, materials, technology, and cultural context, to understand its design, function, and cultural significance.

Architecture represents a snapshot in time and can, in a very detailed fashion, animate the civilisation and people that created it. Architectural analytics can allow a large amount of information about a monument, settlement or civilisation to be discerned. This ability to inform and present previously unknown facts makes architectural analytics important in piecing together the larger understanding of civilisations and the human story.

== See also ==
- Active reviews for intermediate designs
- Architecture tradeoff analysis method
- Site analysis
- Software architecture analysis method
