= Architecture tradeoff analysis method =

Risk-mitigation process in software engineering

In software engineering, Architecture Tradeoff Analysis Method (ATAM) is a risk-mitigation process used early in the software development life cycle.

ATAM was developed by the Software Engineering Institute at the Carnegie Mellon University. Its purpose is to help choose a suitable architecture for a software system by discovering trade-offs and sensitivity points.

ATAM is most beneficial when done early in the software development life-cycle when the cost of changing architectures is minimal.

== ATAM benefits ==
The following are some of the benefits of the ATAM process:

- identified risks early in the life cycle.
- increased communication among stakeholders.
- clarified quality attribute requirements.
- improved architecture documentation.
- documented basis for architectural decisions.

== ATAM process ==
The ATAM process consists of gathering stakeholders together to analyze business drivers (system functionality, goals, constraints, desired non-functional properties) and from these drivers extract quality attributes that are used to create scenarios. These scenarios are then used in conjunction with architectural approaches and architectural decisions to create an analysis of trade-offs, sensitivity points, and risks (or non-risks). This analysis can be converted to risk themes and their impacts whereupon the process can be repeated. With every analysis cycle, the analysis process proceeds from the more general to the more specific, examining the questions that have been discovered in the previous cycle, until the architecture has been fine-tuned and the risk themes have been addressed.

== Steps of the ATAM process ==
ATAM formally consists of nine steps, outlined below:

1. Present ATAM – Present the concept of ATAM to the stakeholders, and answer any questions about the process.
2. Present business drivers – everyone in the process presents and evaluates the business drivers for the system in question.
3. Present the architecture – the architect presents the high-level architecture to the team, with an 'appropriate level of detail'
4. Identify architectural approaches – different architectural approaches to the system are presented by the team, and discussed.
5. Generate quality attribute utility tree – define the core business and technical requirements of the system, and map them to an appropriate architectural property. Present a scenario for this given requirement.
6. Analyze architectural approaches – Analyze each scenario, rating them by priority. The architecture is then evaluated against each scenario.
7. Brainstorm and prioritize scenarios – among the larger stakeholder group, present the current scenarios, and expand.
8. Analyze architectural approaches – Perform step 6 again with the added knowledge of the larger stakeholder community.
9. Present results – provide all documentation to the stakeholders.

These steps are separated into two phases: Phase 1 consists of steps 1-6 and after this phase, the state and context of the project, the driving architectural requirements and the state of the architectural documentation are known. Phase 2 consists of steps 7-9 and finishes the evaluation.

== See also ==
- ilities
- Architecture-centric design method
- Multi-criteria decision analysis
- ARID
- Software architecture analysis method, precursor to architecture tradeoff analysis method
- Architectural analytics
