= Active reviews for intermediate designs =

In software engineering, active reviews for intermediate designs (ARID) is a method to evaluate software architectures, especially on an intermediate level, i.e. for non-finished architectures. It combines aspects from scenario-based design review techniques, such as the architecture tradeoff analysis method (ATAM) and the software architecture analysis method (SAAM), as well as active design reviews (ADR).

== See also ==
- Architectural analytics
