= Site analysis =

Preliminary phase of architectural and urban design processes

Site analysis is a preliminary phase of architectural and urban design processes dedicated to the study of the climatic, geographical, historical, legal, and infrastructural context of a specific site.

The result of this analytic process is a summary, usually a graphical sketch, which sets in relation the relevant environmental information with the morphology of the site in terms of parcel, topography, and built environment. This result is then used as a starting point for the development of environment-related strategies during the design process.

A number of graphical tools for site analysis have been developed to assist designers in this task. Examples of traditional climate-related site analysis tools are the sundial, the sun path diagram, the radiation square, the wind rose, and the wind square. These conventional methods of site analysis are efficient in simple sites with irrelevant close obstructions, where the analysis can be reduced to the parcel at the ground level or even exclusively to its center point. More elaborated techniques, like Volumetric Site Analysis, can instead be used to study more intricate and obstructed sites like those of high and dense urban settings.

== Process ==
As described by Edward T. White, the site design process is divided up into three sections; research phase, analysis phase, and synthesis phase. These three phases are divided into the eight chronological steps in the design process.

- Research phase: The first step is defining the problem and its definition. This is part of the research phase. The site design and site planning process begins with the initial problem to be solved. This is started by a client contracting a planner to work with a particular site.
- Analysis phase: The next step involves programming the site as well as site and user analysis, which is focused on in-depth below. There are numerous site elements related to the analysis during this phase. This is part of the analysis phase in site planning.
- Synthesis phase: From the analysis, a program is developed, which is part of the synthesis phase. The third step deals with schematic design of a site plan as well as a preliminary cost estimate for the site. Step four involves more developed designs and a detailed cost estimate. Step five is the construction documents or the plan. Bidding and contracting for the project follows as step six. Construction then will take place as step seven. The final step, step eight, in the site design process is occupation and management of the site.

== Elements ==
Numerous elements go into a given site analysis. These elements include location, neighborhood context, site and zoning, legal elements, natural physical features, man-made features, circulation, utilities, sensory, human and cultural, and climate components. The following elements typically are considered in most sites:

=== Location ===
The site should be related to major streets or landmarks previously existing. Aerial photographs help in this assessment stage. There should be documentation of distances and time from major places. This should be completed by either driving or walking the distance first-hand.

=== Neighborhood context ===
Zoning of the neighborhood is important and information of this type can typically be found at the municipal planning department of the site. Numerous issues at this stage require direct observation. Features of this sort include architectural patterns, street lighting, and condition of existing buildings. This would also include the immediate surroundings of the site. The reaction of the surrounding buildings towards the site and people moving around should be analysed. Other important components of the neighborhood context include an analysis of existing paths (pedestrian, cyclist, and vehicle), landmarks and nodes. Landmarks are distinctive sites that provide way-finding for people in the area, and which define the character of a neighborhood. Nodes are key public gathering places that encourage people to linger and socialize.

=== Site and zoning ===
Site boundaries can be located by either verifying the dimensions physically or contacting the county tax assessor’s office. Zoning classifications, set-backs, height restrictions, allowable site coverage, uses, and parking requirements are obtained by obtaining zoning classifications from a zoning map, which can be located from the city planning department.

- Infrastructure, social, and political boundaries.

=== Legal ===
Typical legal information can be obtained from the deed to the property. The deed is held by the owner of the title insurance company. In the deed is information such as the property description, present ownership, and the governmental jurisdiction the site is located in, and the city or county.

=== Natural physical features ===
Most of this information will be derived from the topographic features on the site. A contour map of this magnitude can be located from the survey engineer. Drainage problems as well as existing natural features of trees, ground cover, ground texture, and soil conditions on the site should be directly observed.

=== Human-made features ===
Features located on the site such as buildings, walls, fences, patios, plazas, bus stop shelters should be noted. The site and location of such features should be directly measured. Documentation of existing historical districts should be made, some of which may already have reports completed. Locating this information can be done through the municipal planning department for the site.

=== Circulation ===
The uses of streets, roads, alleys, sidewalks, and plazas are important in this inventory step. It is not necessarily an analysis of these elements but more an analysis of what occurs on these circulation gateways.

=== Utilities ===
Information for utilities concerning the site can be found through the utility departments and companies in the local area. Generally, the company has a print of the drawing of this information needed. Information in this print includes the location of all utilities and their locations around or on the site itself.

=== Sensory ===
Much of the sensory information collected will be done through first hand experience. The information is obtained from sketching and photographs (sometimes aerial photographs). Direct observation of other sensory elements of noise, odors, smoke, and pollutant areas must also be completed.

=== Human and cultural ===
This information can be obtained through census statistics on the neighborhood. Information regarding these statistics is available from the local municipal planning agency. This information includes activities among people on the site and their relationships to these activities...

=== Climate ===
This information can be obtained through the local weather service, third party services, and climatic surveys. Conditions such as rainfall, snowfall, humidity, and temperature over months must be considered and analyzed. The sun-path and vertical sun angles throughout an entire year are important to note.

== See also ==
- Architectural analytics
- Site survey
