= Patient trade-off =

The trade-off dilemma, or patient trade-off, refers to the choice between the expected beneficial and harmful effects in terms of patient survival and quality of life for a particular medical treatment. The choice involves a trade-off so it is of central importance for the patient and the physician to have access to empirical information on established treatment benefits and side effects. Research on this issue has been done upon prostate cancer.

== Example of prostate cancer ==
An example of such trade-off is prostate cancer treatment. Distress of this treatment includes urinary and bowel symptoms and waning sexual function. An important factor here is that prevalence of these symptoms and the distress they cause varies between types of treatment and individual patients. Patient trade-off shows the importance in collecting information needed to make such decisions.

=== Life expectancy and sexual function trade off ===
One option is to trade off an intact sexual function for the possibility of a prolonged life expectancy by not having curative treatment. A Swedish study found that the willingness to do this kind of trade-off varied considerably among the men included in the study. While six out of ten were willing to consider a trade-off between life expectancy and intact sexual function, given the present knowledge of treatment benefits for clinically localized prostate cancer, four out of ten stated that they would under all circumstances choose treatment irrespective of the risk for waning sexual function. Access to valid empirical information is crucial for such decision making. Key factors here are an individual's feeling towards the illness, their emotional values and religious beliefs.

=== Stress of making trade-off decisions ===
A substantial proportion of patients and physicians, experience stress in judging the trade-off between different treatment options and treatment side-effects which adds to the stress of cancer diagnosed, a situation made worse in that eight out of ten prostate cancer patients have no one to confide in except their spouse and one out of five live in total emotional isolation.

== Issues needing research ==
It has not yet been empirically documented how far an individual may decide or not to select a treatment if in theory some positive treatment effects to counteract its negative effects.
