= Site plan =

Drawing of an area's existing & proposed conditions

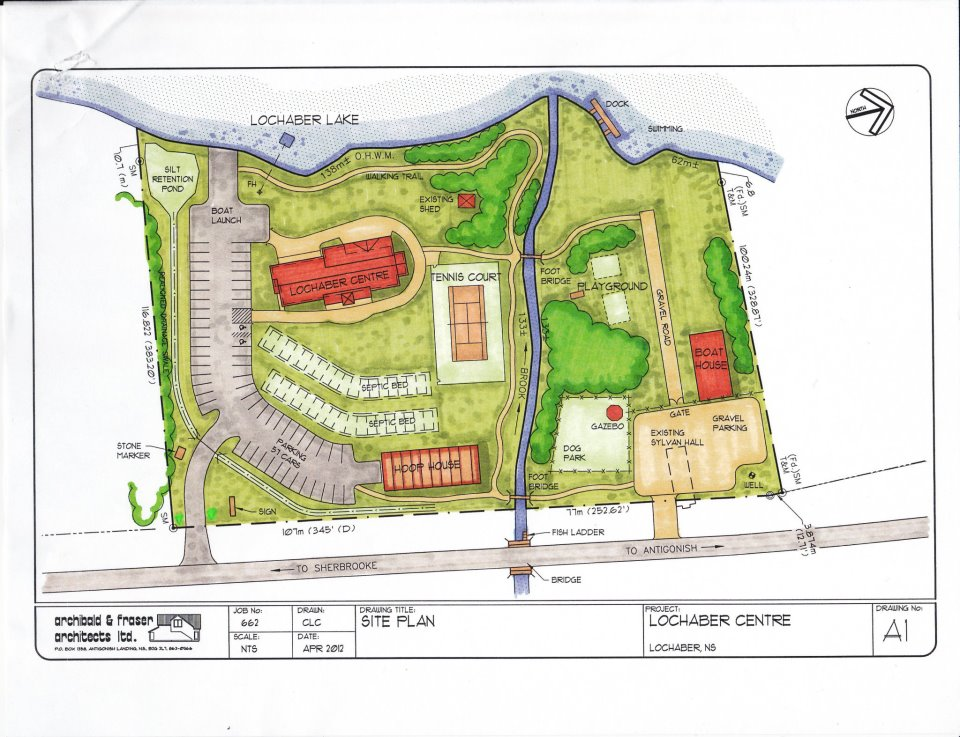
Example of a site plan.

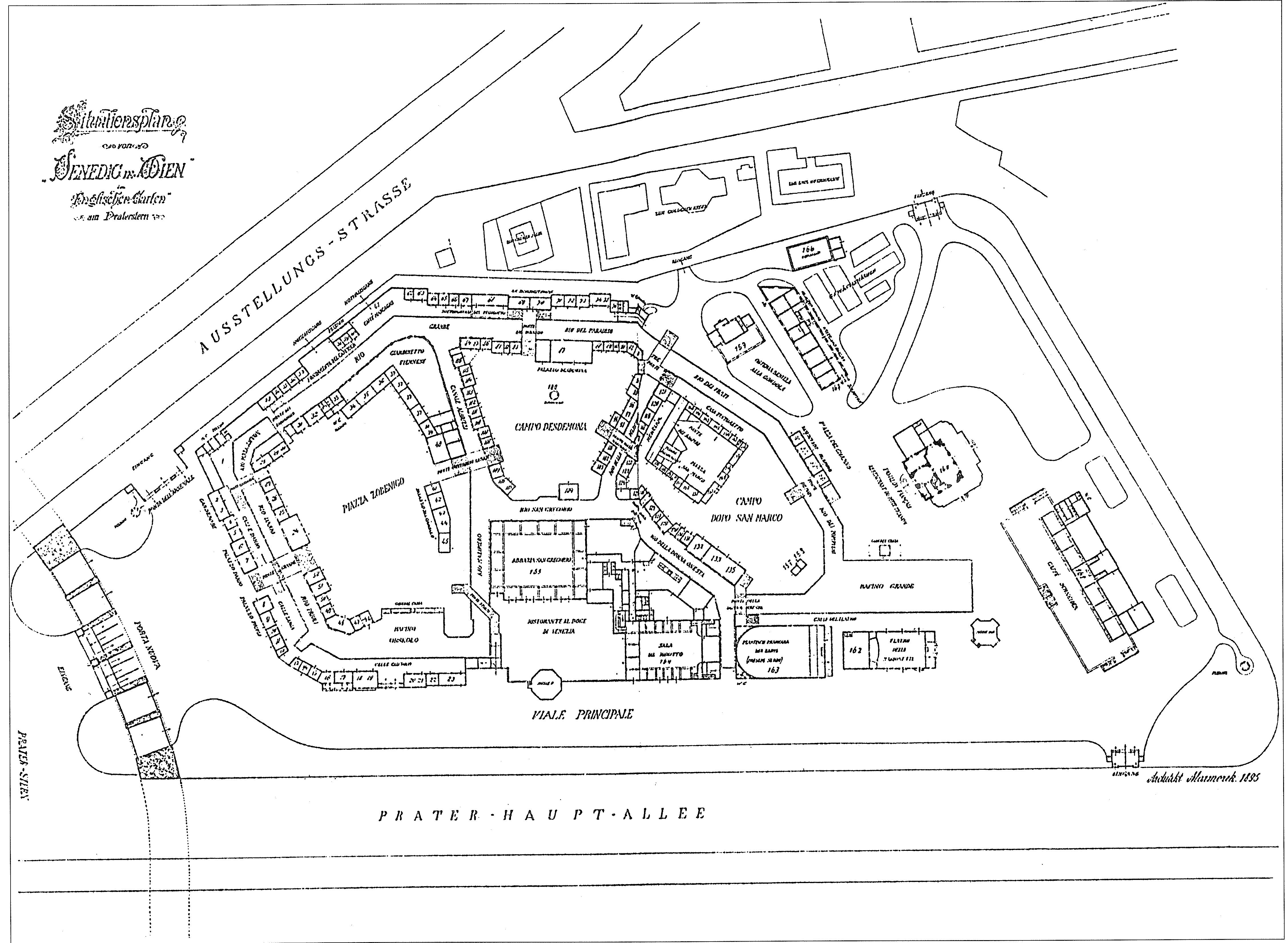
A plot plan

A site plan or a plot plan is a type of drawing used by architects, landscape architects, urban planners, and engineers which shows existing and proposed conditions for a given area, typically a parcel of land which is to be modified. Site plans typically show buildings, roads, sidewalks and paths/trails, parking, drainage facilities, sanitary sewer lines, water lines, lighting, and landscaping and garden elements.

Such a plan of a site is a "graphic representation of the arrangement of buildings, parking, drives, landscaping and any other structure that is part of a development project".

A site plan is a "set of construction drawings that a builder or contractor uses to make improvements to a property. Counties can use the site plan to verify that development codes are being met and as a historical resource. Site plans are often prepared by a design consultant who must be either a licensed engineer, architect, landscape architect or land surveyor".

Site plans include site analysis, building elements, and planning of various types including transportation and urban. An example of a site plan is the plan for Indianapolis by Alexander Ralston in 1821.

The specific objects and relations shown are dependent on the purpose for creating the plot plan, but typically contain: retained and proposed buildings, landscape elements, above-ground features and obstructions, major infrastructure routes, and critical legal considerations such as property boundaries, setbacks, and rights of way…

== Site plan topics ==
=== Site analysis ===
Site analysis is an inventory completed as a preparatory step to site planning, a form of urban planning which involves research, analysis, and synthesis. It primarily deals with basic data as it relates to a specific site. The topic itself branches into the boundaries of architecture, landscape architecture, engineering, economics, and urban planning. Site analysis is an element in site planning and design. Kevin A. Lynch, an urban planner developed an eight cycle step process of site design, in which the second step is site analysis, the focus of this section.

When analyzing a potential site for development, the status quo of the site should be analyzed and mapped. This includes but is not limited to:

- The location of the plot
- Topography, including information about slope, soils, hydrology, vegetation, orientation
- Existing buildings
- Roads and traffic
- Public facilities and utilities, including water, sewer, and power lines
- Related laws, regulation, codes, and policies

By determining areas that are poor for development (such as floodplains or steep slopes) and better for development, the planner or architect can determine the optimal location for different functions or structures and create a design that works within the space.

=== Site plan building blocks ===
Scottish Parliament Building site plan

A site plan is a top view, bird’s eye view of a property that is drawn to scale. A site plan can show:

- property lines
- outline of existing and proposed buildings and structures
- distance between buildings
- distance between buildings and property lines (setbacks)
- parking lots, indicating parking spaces
- driveways
- surrounding streets
- landscaped areas
- easements
- ground sign location
- utilities

=== Site planning ===
Site planning in landscape architecture and architecture refers to the organizational stage of the landscape design process. It involves the organization of land use zoning, access, circulation, privacy, security, shelter, land drainage, and other factors. Site planning includes the arrangement of buildings, roadways, utilities, landscape elements, topography, water features, and vegetation to achieve the desired site.

In urban planning, site planning is done by city planners to develop a clear plan/design of what the city planners want for a community. For example, in a participatory planning process, community members would make claims of renovations and improvements that need to be done in their community. Then the community developers will come up with a way to meet the community members' demand, which is done by creating a site plan. With a limited budget, planners have to be smart and creative about their designs. Planners must take into consideration not only heights of buildings, traffic flows, open spaces, parking for cars/bikes, but also the project's potential impact to the stakeholders involved. All these actions of creating a site plan is referred to as site planning.

=== Transportation planning ===
Transportation planning is the field involved with the siting of transportation facilities (generally streets, highways, sidewalks, bike lanes and public transport lines). Transportation planning historically has followed the rational planning model of defining goals and objectives, identifying problems, generating alternatives, evaluating alternatives, and developing the plan. Other models for planning include rational actor, satisficing, incremental planning, organizational process, and political bargaining. However, planners are increasingly expected to adopt a multi-disciplinary approach, especially due to the rising importance of environmentalism. For example, the use of behavioral psychology to persuade drivers to abandon their automobiles and use public transport instead. The role of the transport planner is shifting from technical analysis to promoting sustainability through integrated transport policies.

=== Urban planning ===
Urban, city, and town planning explores a very wide range of aspects of the built and social environments of places. Regional planning deals with a still larger environment, at a less detailed level. Based upon the origins of urban planning from the Roman (pre-Dark Ages) era, the current discipline revisits the synergy of the disciplines of urban planning, architecture and landscape architecture.

== Examples ==
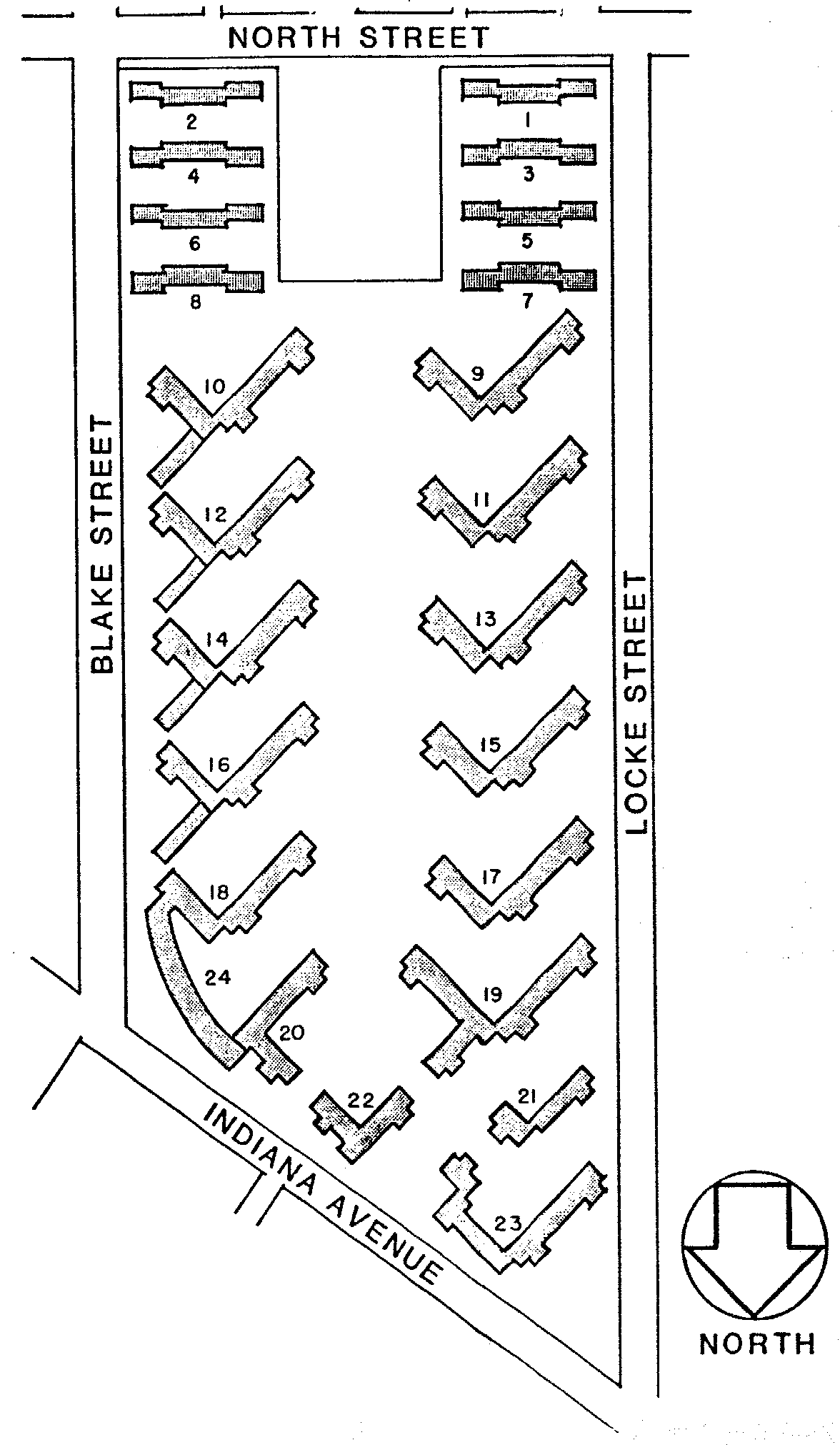
Lockefield Gardens - site plan.

WTC Building Arrangement and Site Plan.

Site plan of Tres Zapotes

Site Plan of the Lincoln Home Site

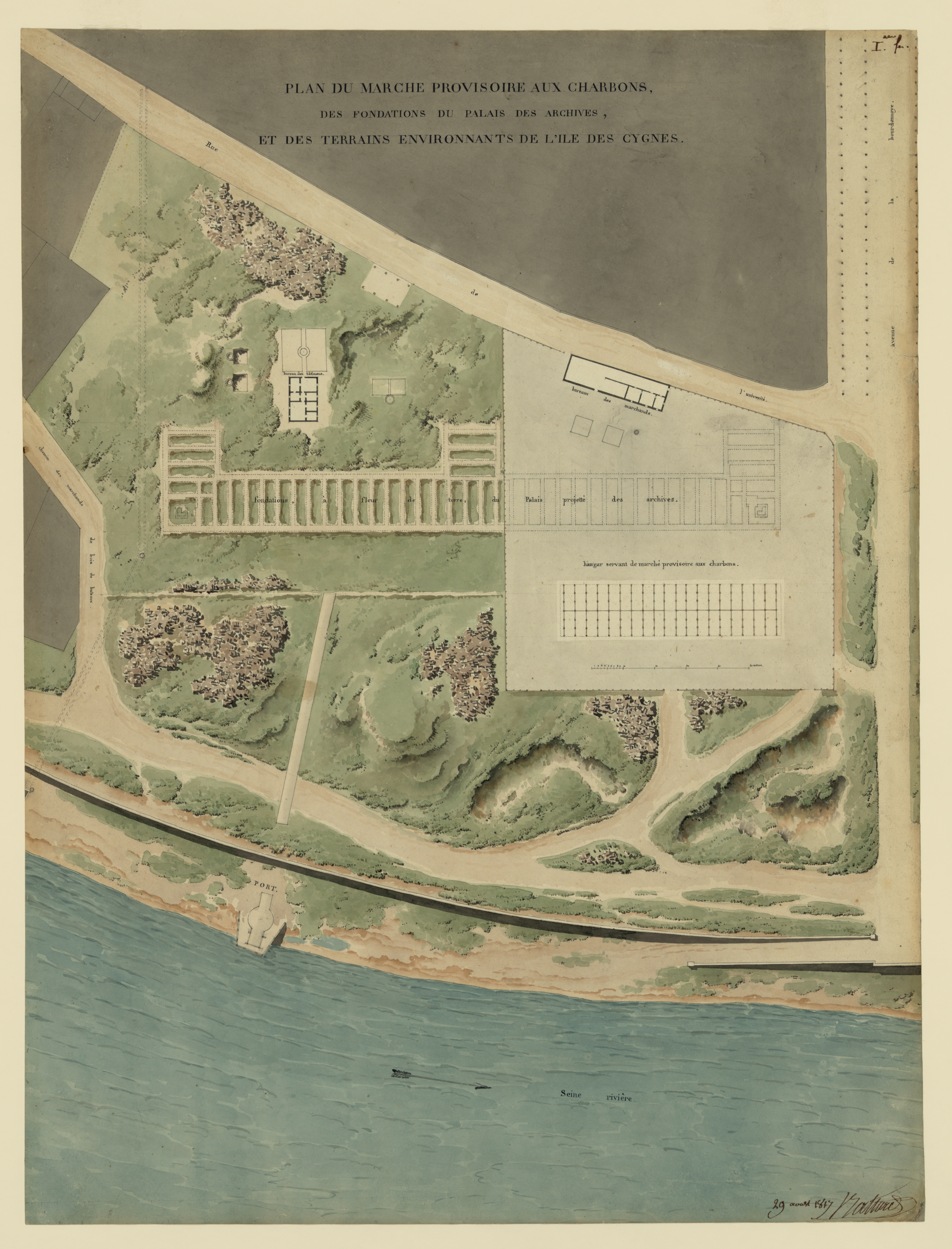
Rendered site plan by Louis-Pierre Baltard

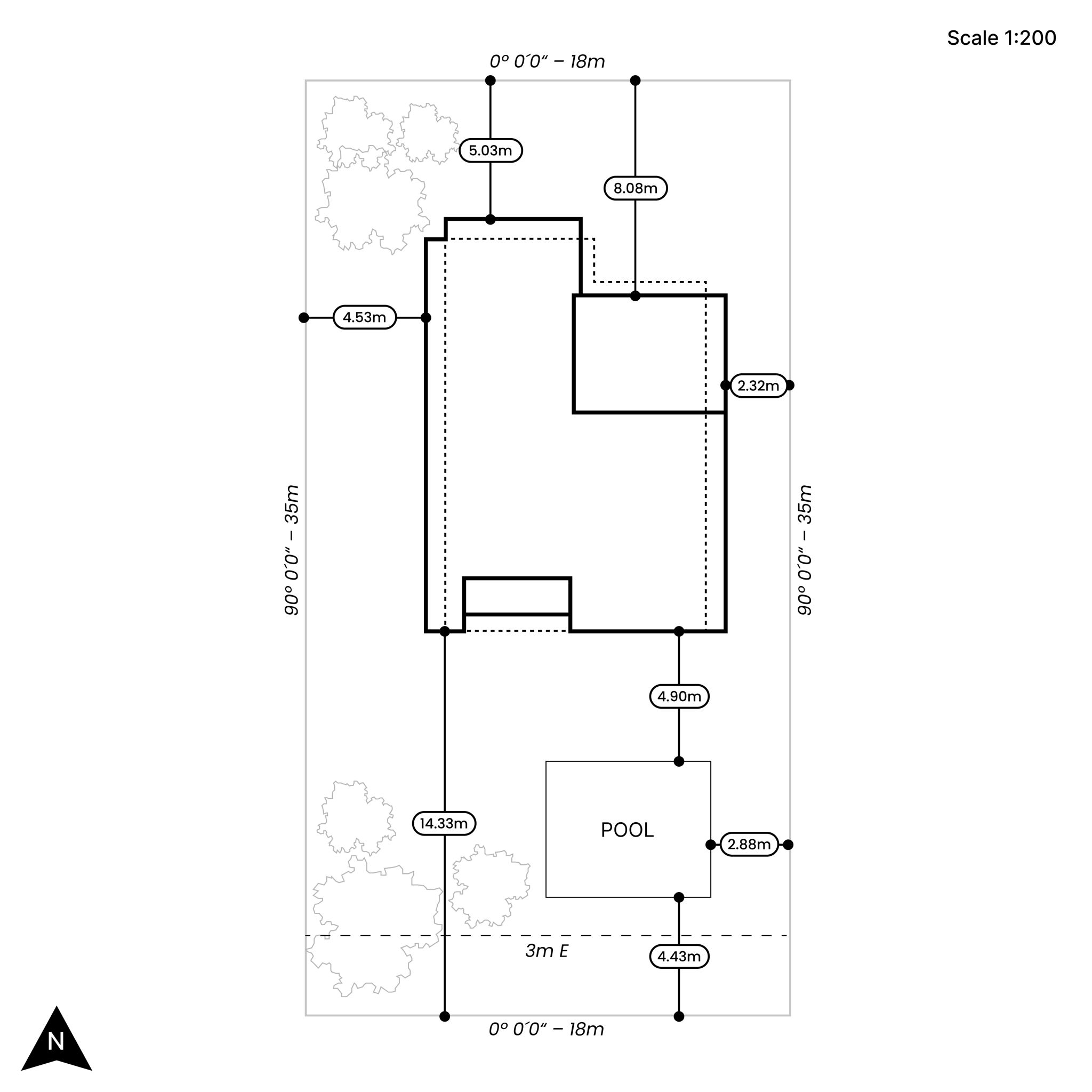
Standard example of a preliminary site plan of a single one storey family home.

== See also ==
- Plan (drawing)
- Archaeological plan
- Floor plan
- Technical drawing
- Architectural drawing
- Engineering drawing
- Landscape design
