= Software architecture analysis method =

Software architecture analysis method (SAAM) is a method used in software architecture to evaluate a system architecture. It was the first documented software architecture analysis method, and was developed in the mid 1990s to analyze a system for modifiability, but it is useful for testing any non-functional aspect.

SAAM was a precursor to the architecture tradeoff analysis method.

== See also ==
- ARID
- Architectural analytics
