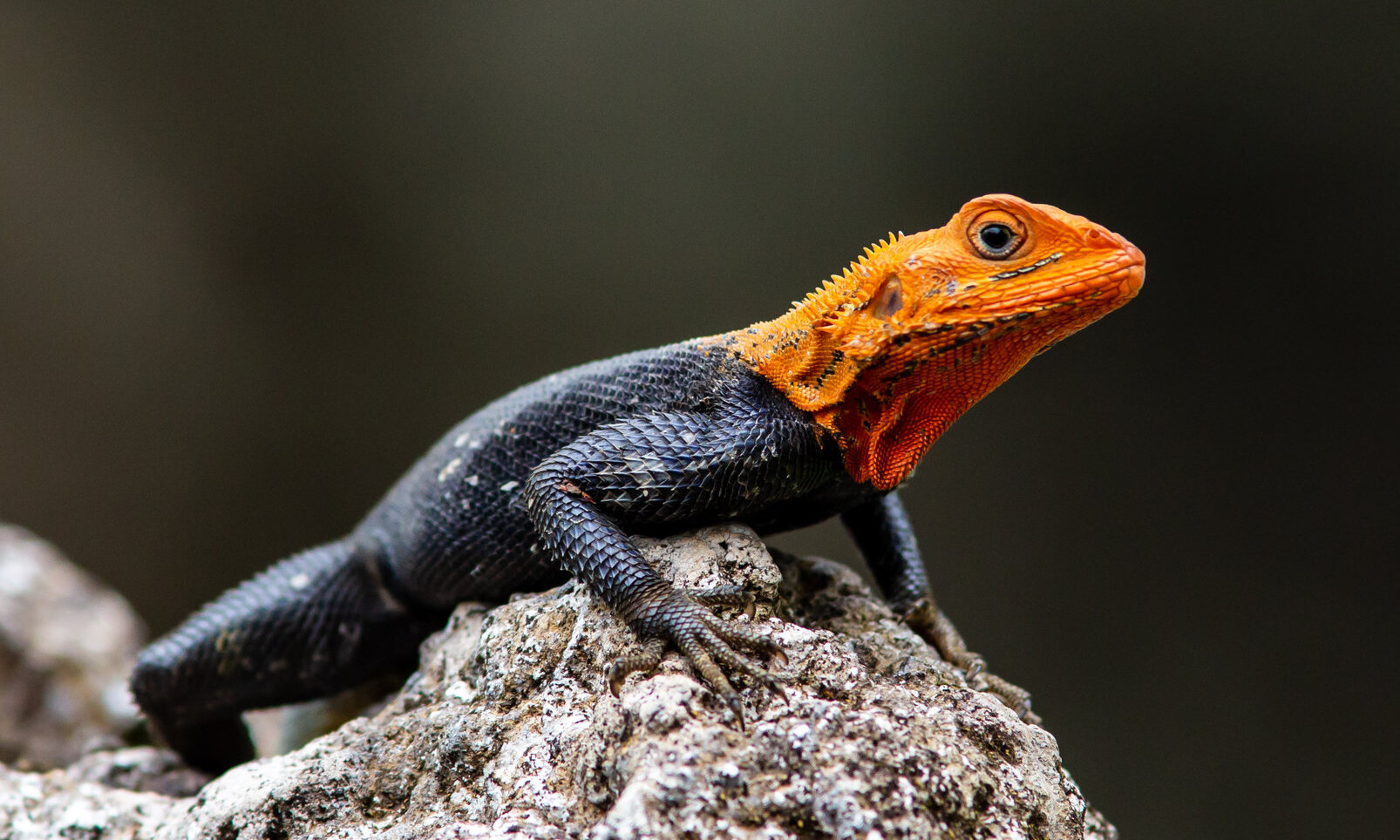
- Male, in Cameroon
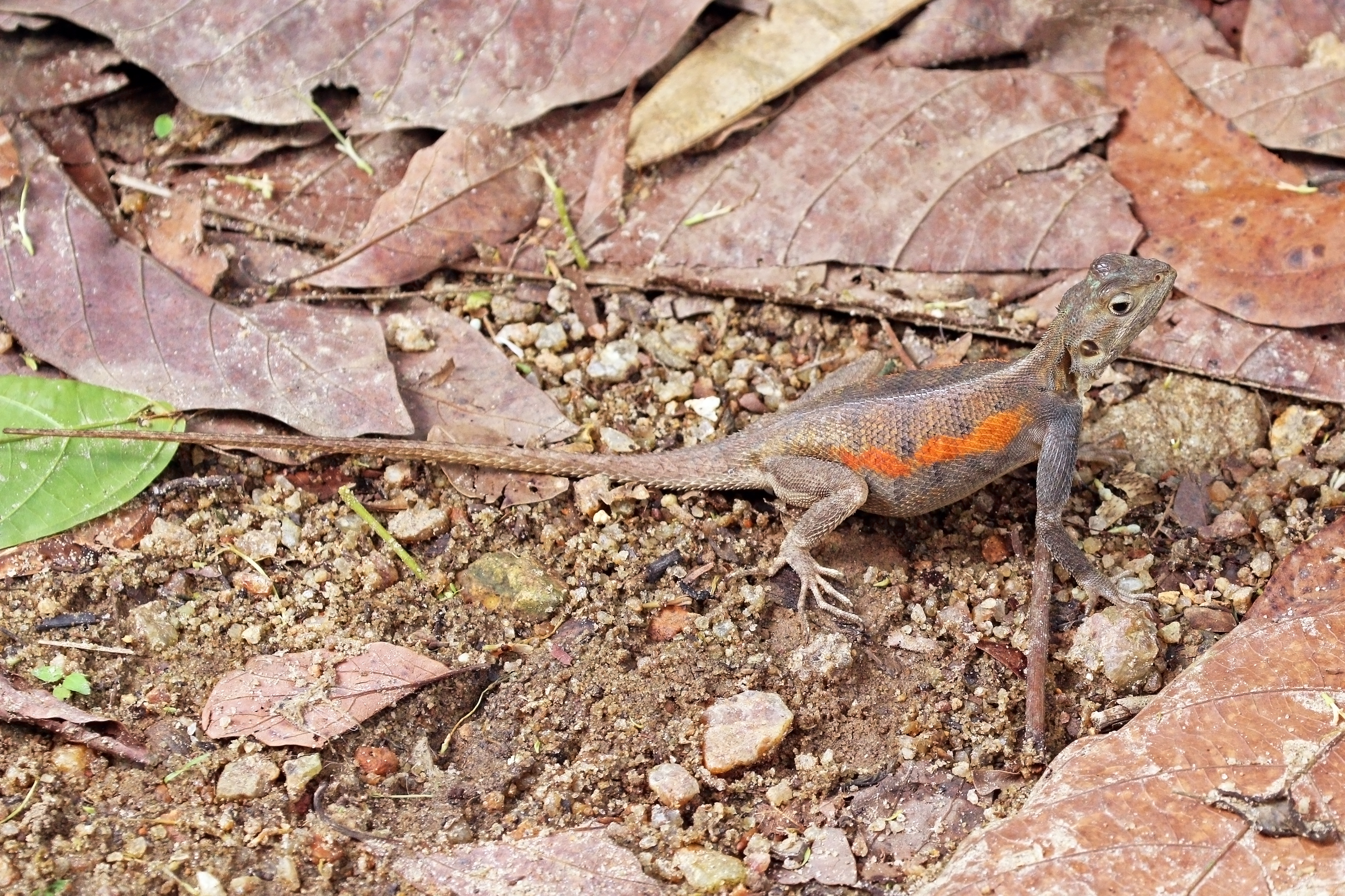
- Female, in Kakum National Park, Ghana

Conservation status
- Least Concern (IUCN 3.1)

Scientific classification
- Kingdom: Animalia
- Phylum: Chordata
- Class: Reptilia
- Order: Squamata
- Suborder: Iguania
- Family: Agamidae
- Genus: Agama
- Species: A. agama

Binomial name
- Agama agama (Linnaeus, 1758)

= Agama agama =

Species of lizard

The common agama or red-headed rock agama (Agama agama) is a species of lizard from the family Agamidae found in most of sub-Saharan Africa and in Florida where it has spread. To clear up centuries of historical confusion based on Linnaeus and other authors, Wagner et al. designated a neotype (numbered ZFMK 15222) for the species, using a previously described specimen from Cameroon in the collection of the Zoologisches Forschungsmuseum Alexander Koenig in Bonn. The species name was formerly applied to a paraphyletic collection of taxa (a so-called wastebasket); subsequent mitochondrial DNA analysis of various populations indicates they represent separate species. Consequently, three former subspecies A. a. africana, A. a. boensis, and A. a. mucosoensis are now considered separate species, and A. a. savattieri is considered synonymous with A. africana.

== Description ==
Its size varies from 13 to 30 cm (5.1 to 11.8 in) in total length. Males are typically 7.5 to 12 cm (3.0 to 4.7 in) longer than the average female. The agama lizard can be identified by having a white underside, brown back limbs and a tail with a light stripe down the middle. The stripe on the tail typically possesses about six to seven dark patches along its side. Females, adolescents and subordinate males have an olive green head, while a dominant male has a blue body and yellow tail.

== Distribution and habitat ==
The common agama is native to countries such as Benin, Burkina Faso, Cameroon, Cape Verde, Chad, Equatorial Guinea, Gabon, The Gambia, Ghana, Guinea, Guinea-Bissau, Ivory Coast, Kenya, Liberia, Madagascar, Mali, Mauritania, Niger, Nigeria, Senegal, Sierra Leone, Togo, Tanzania and Uganda. However, it has been introduced through the reptile trade to southern Florida, where it has become extremely common.

Agama agama is well-adapted to arid conditions. These lizards remain active throughout the day except for the hottest hour, when even shaded spots can reach 38 °C (100 °F).

== Diet ==
Common agamas are primarily insectivores, but they have been known to eat small mammals and reptiles and vegetation such as flowers, grasses, and fruits. Their diet consists of mainly ants, grasshoppers, beetles and termites. They catch their prey using their tongue, the tip of which is covered by mucous glands that enable the lizard to hold to smaller prey.

== Behaviour ==
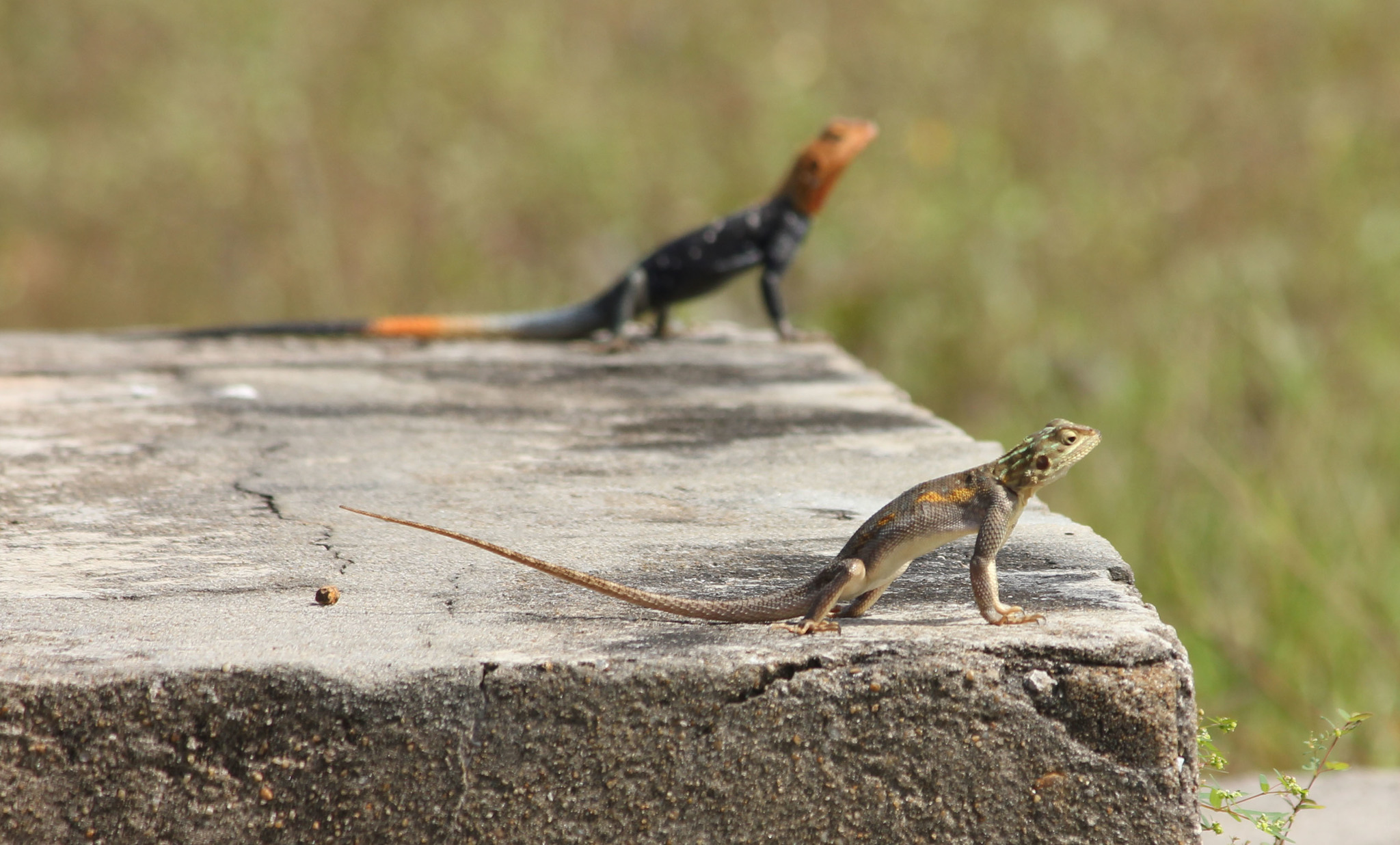
Male and female, in Liberia

Male agamas are territorial and must fight other males to claim their space. Agamas live in social groups including a lead male, about half a dozen females, and subordinate males. Subordinate males can only gain their own group if they eliminate the existing lead male (the "cock") or establish a colony outside all other cocks' territory. Only the cock is allowed to mate with the females. The center of a cock's territory is usually marked by the presence of a physical object, such as a tree or boulder, on which the lizards congregate. In urban areas, fights between males are more common because space is at a higher premium.

== Reproduction ==
Females are sexually mature at 14–18 months, while males take 2 years. Agama agama tends to reproduce during the wet season, but can also reproduce in areas that receive constant rainfall. After fertilization and when she is ready to lay, the female will dig a hole 5 cm (2 in) deep with her snout and claws in damp, sandy soil that is covered with grasses or other plants and which receives sunlight during most of the day. Once finished, the female will lay a clutch of 5–7 ellipsoidal eggs that hatch within a period of 8–10 weeks.

The sex of common agama embryos are determined by temperature, so all male eggs experienced a temperature of 29 °C (84 °F) while female eggs are in the 26–27 °C (79–81 °F) range. After hatching, the offspring will measure about 3.7 cm (1.5 in) snout to vent, plus their 7.5 cm (3.0 in) tail.

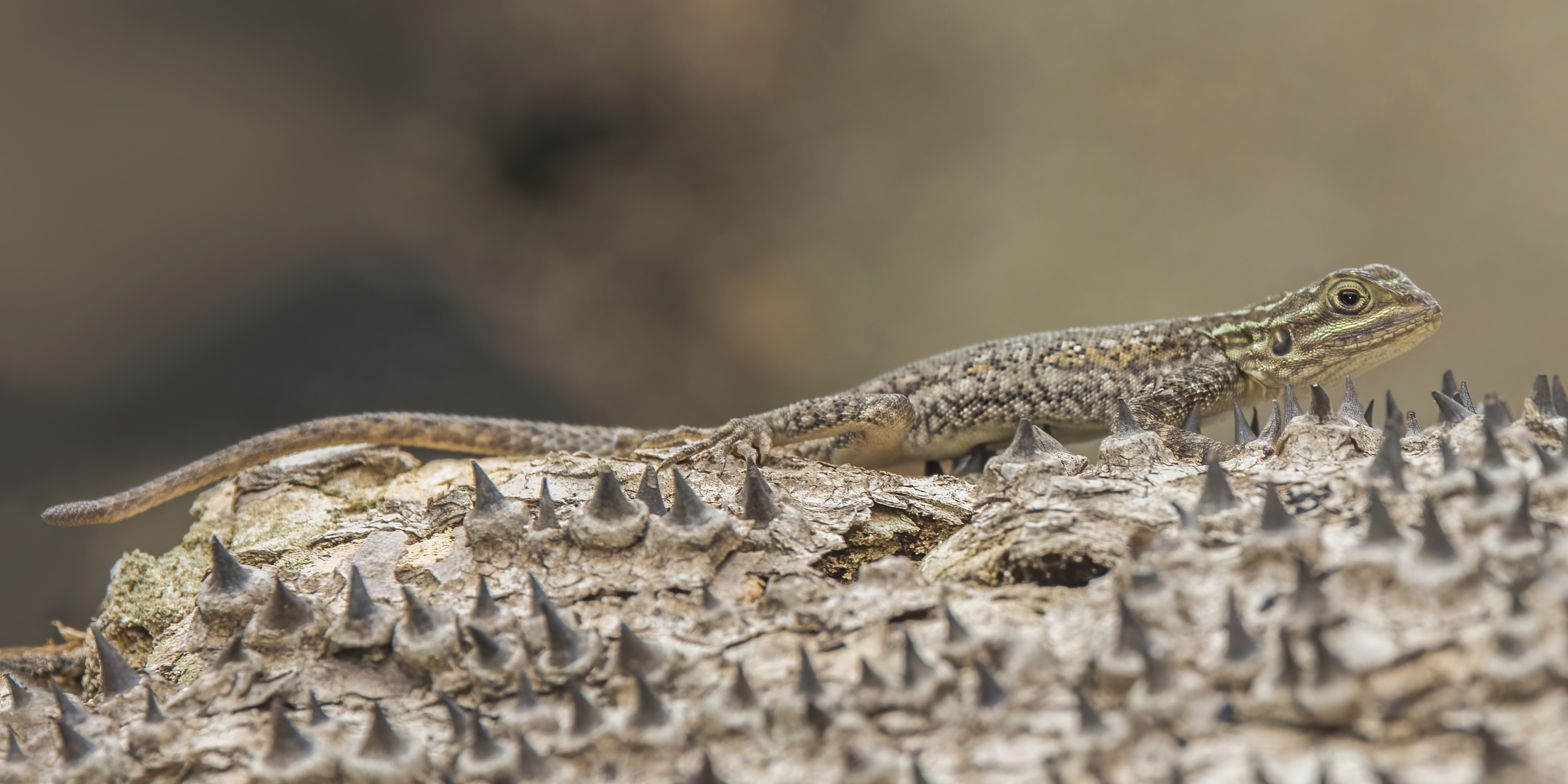
juvenile, Ghana

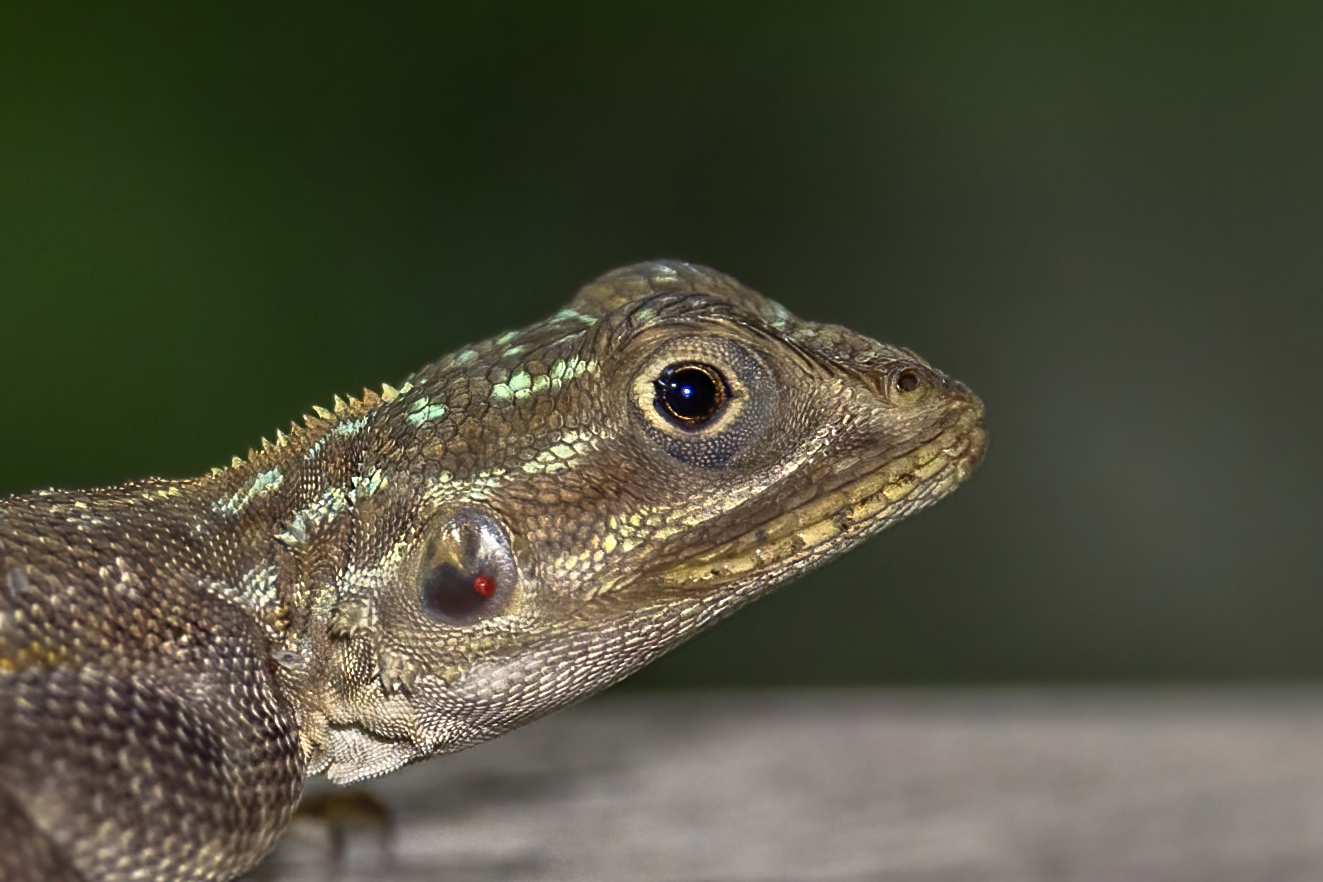
juvenile, Ghana

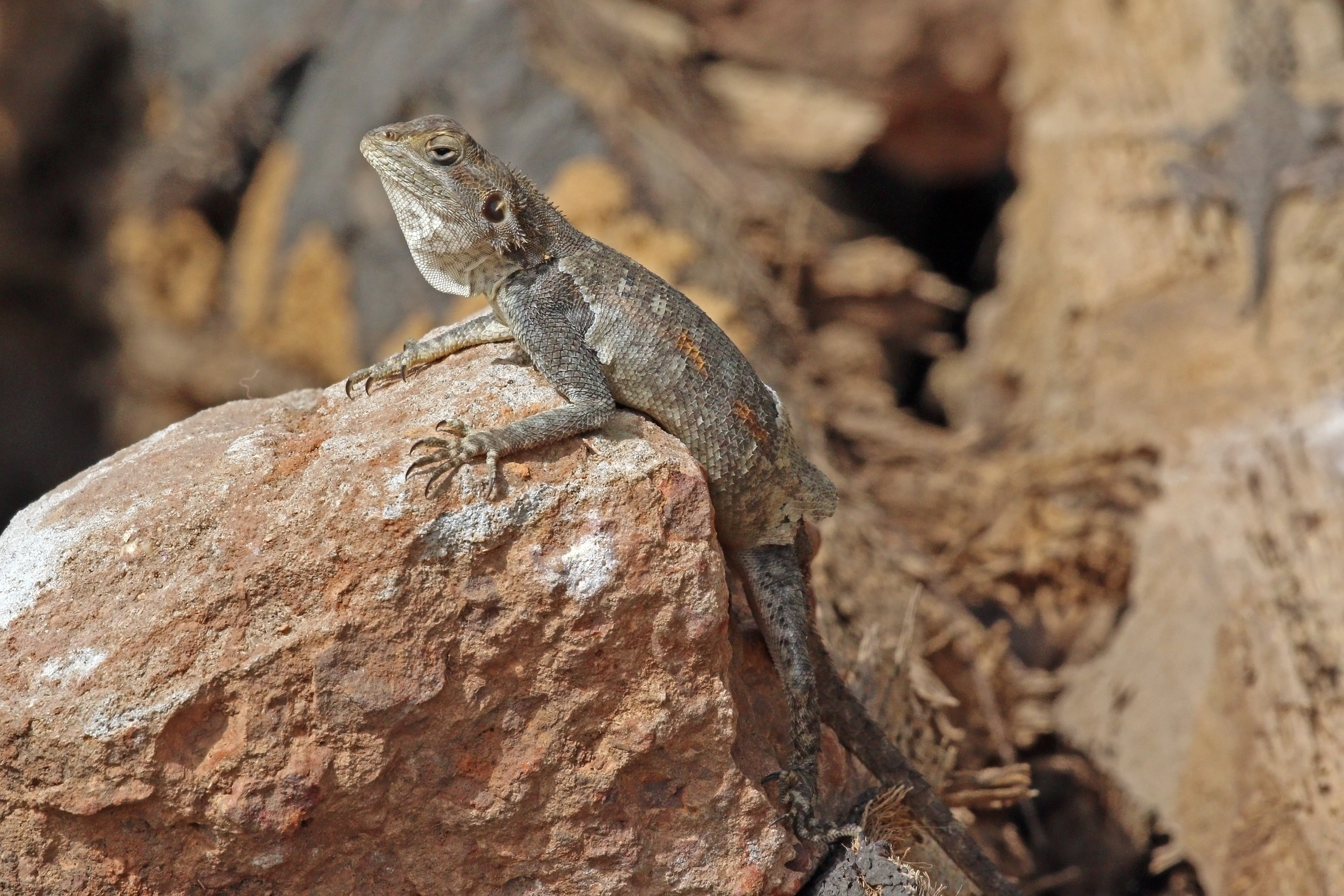
A female with moult, Gambia

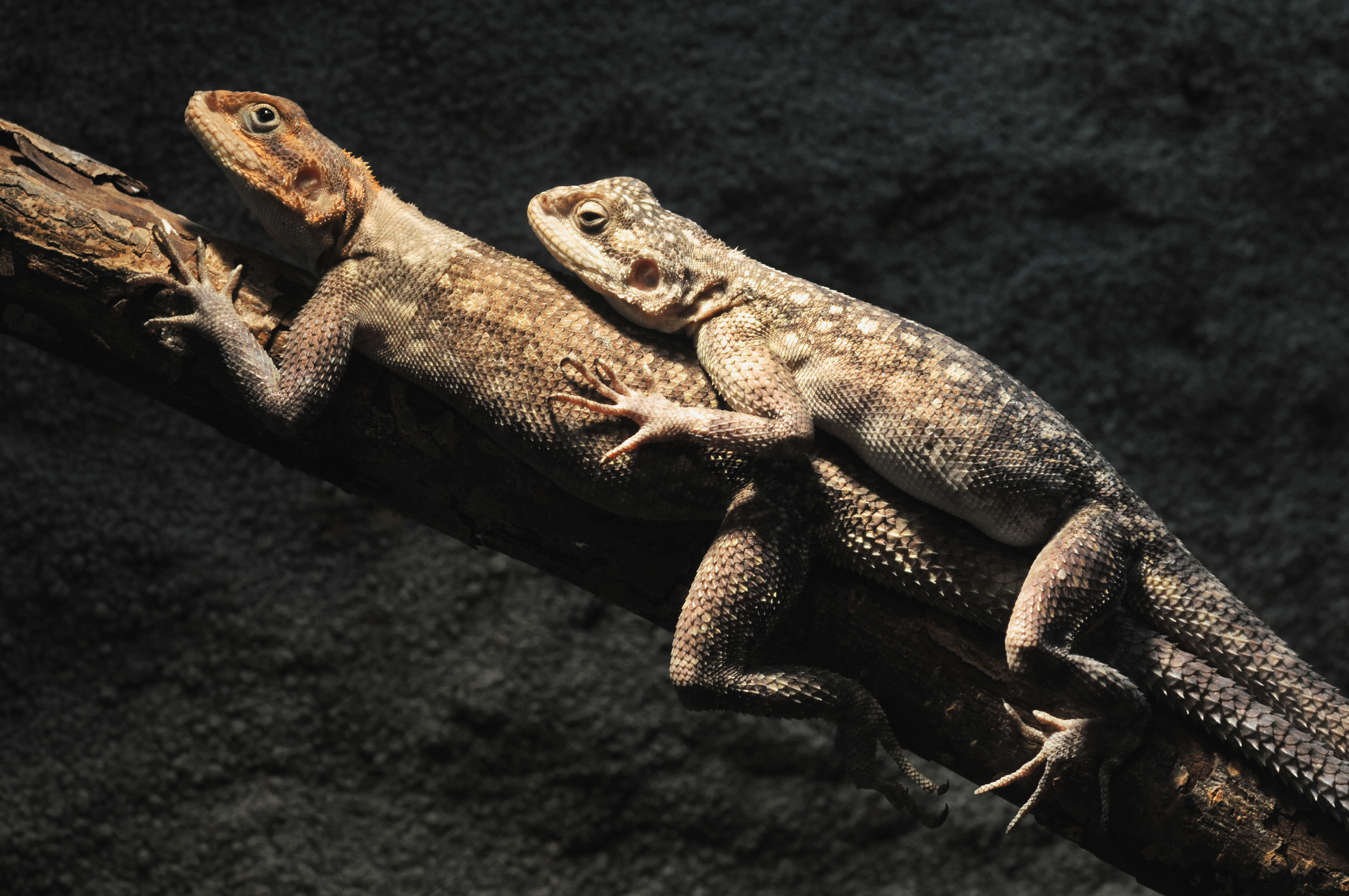
Zoo Schmiding near Bad Schallerbach, Austria

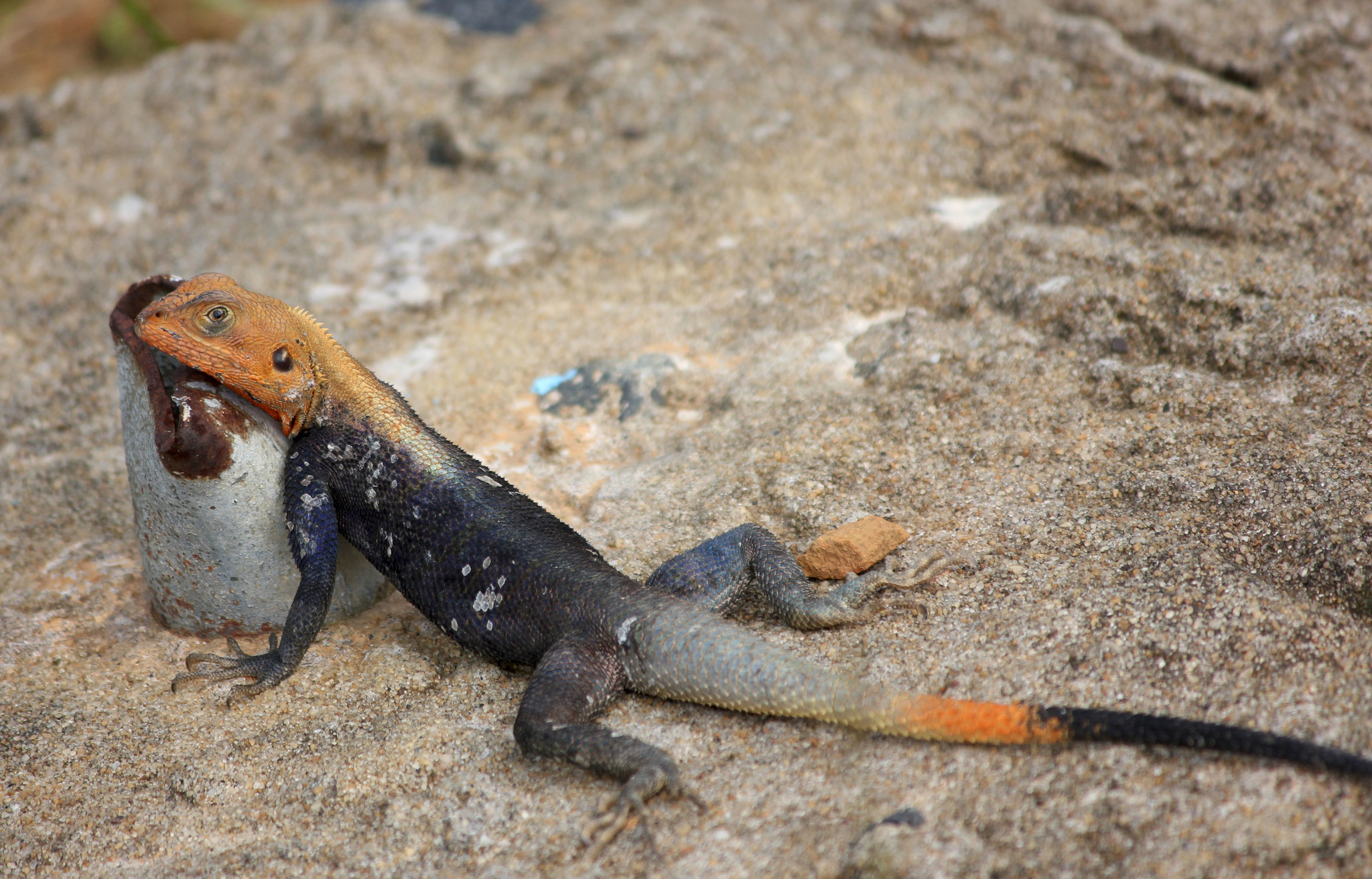
Male, in Liberia

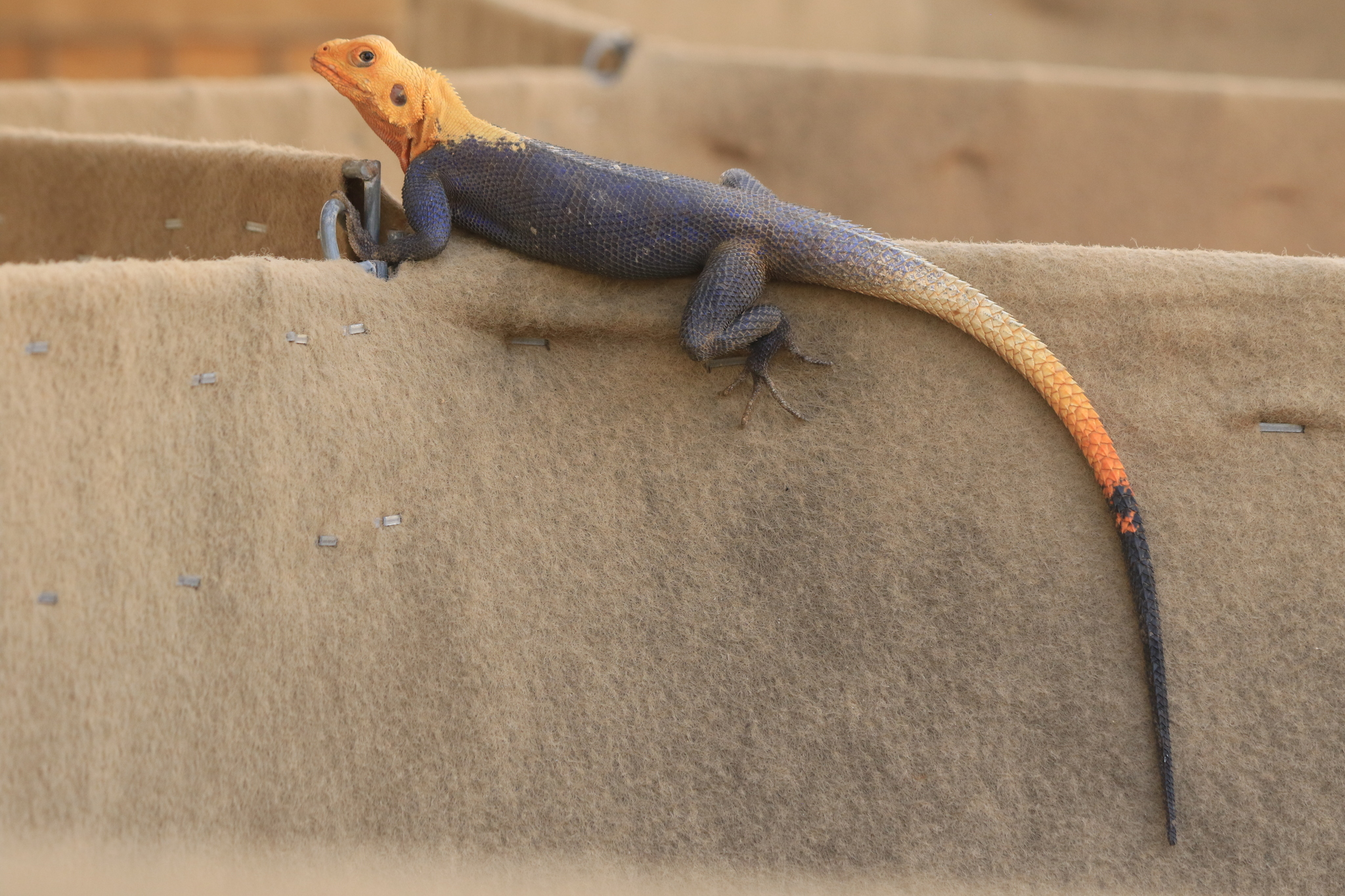
Male, in Niger

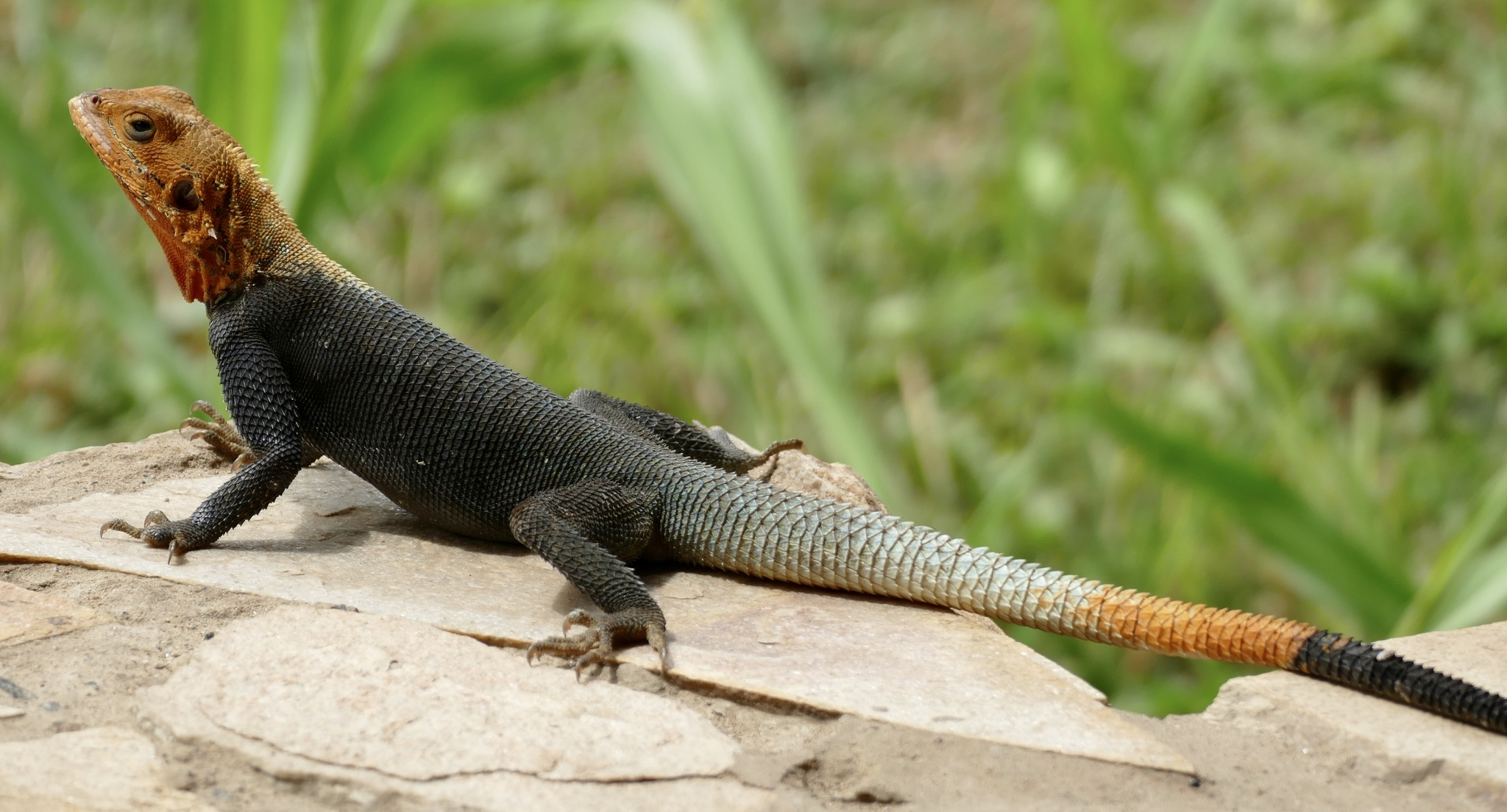
Male, in Ghana
