= Williamson tradeoff model =

The Williamson tradeoff model is a theoretical model in the economics of industrial organization which emphasizes the tradeoff associated with horizontal mergers between gains resulting from lower costs of production and the losses associated with higher prices due to greater degree of monopoly power.

The model was first presented by Oliver Williamson in his 1968 paper "Economies as an Antitrust Defense: The welfare tradeoffs" in the American Economic Review. Williamson argued that ignoring efficiencies that may result from proposed mergers in antitrust law "fail[ed] to meet the basic test of economic rationality".

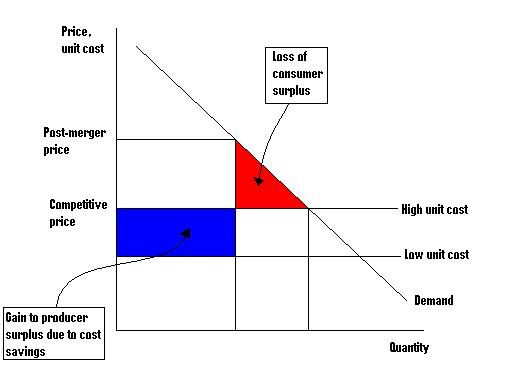
Graphical illustration of the Williamson tradeoff model

== Basic idea of the model ==
Suppose that a given industry is initially characterized by perfect competition and has a constant unit cost of production equal to c1 (assumed the same across all firms in the industry). Because of competition, the market price of the good produced will be equal to this unit cost, which means that firms in the industry earn normal profits, as captured by the producer surplus (the area below the market price, but above the supply/unit cost curve).

Suppose further that after a merger between firms in the industry takes place, unit costs fall to c2<c1 as a result of economies of scale or other forms of synergy. However, the industry is now less competitive, with a monopoly being the most extreme example. Since the firm is no longer a price taker, the price it charges will be above the (now lower) unit cost. For a monopoly, for example, the price will be set where the unit/marginal cost intersects marginal revenue. This means that the amount of consumer surplus, the area below the demand curve and above the price, will be lower.

The change in overall social surplus of the market depends on whether the increase in producer surplus due to lower production costs is larger or smaller than the fall in consumer surplus due to higher prices. Note that it is theoretically possible that the fall in unit costs due to the merger could be sufficiently large that the post merger monopoly price ends up being lower than the pre merger competitive price in which case both producer and consumer surplus would increase. In that situation no tradeoff exists and the merger is unambiguously beneficial to all market participants. More generally however, a horizontal merger can involve both costs and benefits.

== Applications in antitrust policy ==
One implication of the Williamson model is that the gains from cost reduction do not have to be "large" in order to outweigh the losses that result from higher prices. This is because the welfare losses associated with the latter tend to be "second-order" (graphically, they are triangles), while the gains tend to be "first-order" (rectangles). What this means is that the gains from the merger would have to be very small, or alternatively, the demand for the good in question would have to be relatively quite inelastic for social surplus to decrease.

A broader conclusion of the model is that antitrust, or competition, policy should be "discretionary". That is, government regulators who are faced with a proposed merger need to examine each proposal on a case-by-case basis. In some instances, the cost savings might make it worth the loss of competition, while in others they will not. This is in contrast to a "non-discretionary" policy where regulators set certain standards that any industry must meet - for example, that no firm has more than 20% market share. Then, they do not actually examine the potential gains or losses to consumer or producer surplus from a proposed merger, but only its impact on meeting the set standard - for example, whether or not the merger will increase a single firm's market share above 20%.

The model has been applied to the study of mergers in the US rail freight industry and the US food industry, among others. It has also been used in evaluation of actual antitrust laws by American legal scholar and judge Robert Bork. A regulatory approach based on the model was popular in the United States in the 1980s and influenced much antitrust legislation.

== Criticisms and limitations ==
1. The "tradeoff" in the Williamson model involves a gain in producers' (firms') surplus and a loss in consumers' surplus. Thus, in focusing the analysis on total surplus, it neglects distributional issues and treats changes in both consumers' and producers' welfare symmetrically. However, anti-trust policy as actually practiced in many countries (Europe, Canada and US) appears to have the goal of maximizing consumer surplus (or this goal is stated explicitly). In that sense, as long as the post-merger market price is higher than pre-merger, the fact that producer surplus and firm profits rise is immaterial from the point of view of the regulators. In that case, only those mergers in which the fall in unit cost is sufficiently large to ensure a lower price after the merger should be permitted. For this reason, the Williamson model is not applicable in European Union competition law and is controversial in Canada.
2. The simplest version of the model compares a situation where initially the market is competitive to a situation where the post-merger market is not. However, if initially price exceeds marginal cost (i.e. the market is not competitive), further increases in price have a "first order" effect on consumer surplus (graphically, they are trapezoids).
3. The model is limited in that it only considers the effect of the merger on price charged by the firm(s). However, in most real life situations, firms compete on many other aspects other than price, for example product quality, capacity, research and development, and product differentiation. These variables are also likely to be affected by a merger and the basic model does not capture these effects. However, the model can and has been extended in these directions by more recent work.
4. The model ignores the possibilities that the same cost reductions and efficiency gains (once technologically feasible) may arise on their own due without any need for a merger, for example via own-firm investment.
