= Phylogenetic inertia =

Limitations in evolution

Phylogenetic inertia or phylogenetic constraint refers to the limitations on the future evolutionary pathways that have been imposed by previous adaptations.

Charles Darwin first recognized this phenomenon, though the term was later coined by Huber in 1939. Darwin explained the idea of phylogenetic inertia based on his observations; he spoke about it when explaining the "Law of Conditions of Existence". Darwin also suggested that, after speciation, the organisms do not start over from scratch, but have characteristics that are built upon already existing ones that were inherited from their ancestors; and these characteristics likely limit the amount of evolution seen in that new taxa. This is the main concept of phylogenetic inertia.

Richard Dawkins also explained these constraints by likening natural selection to a river in his 1982 book The Extended Phenotype.

== Examples of phylogenetic inertia ==
=== Body plan ===
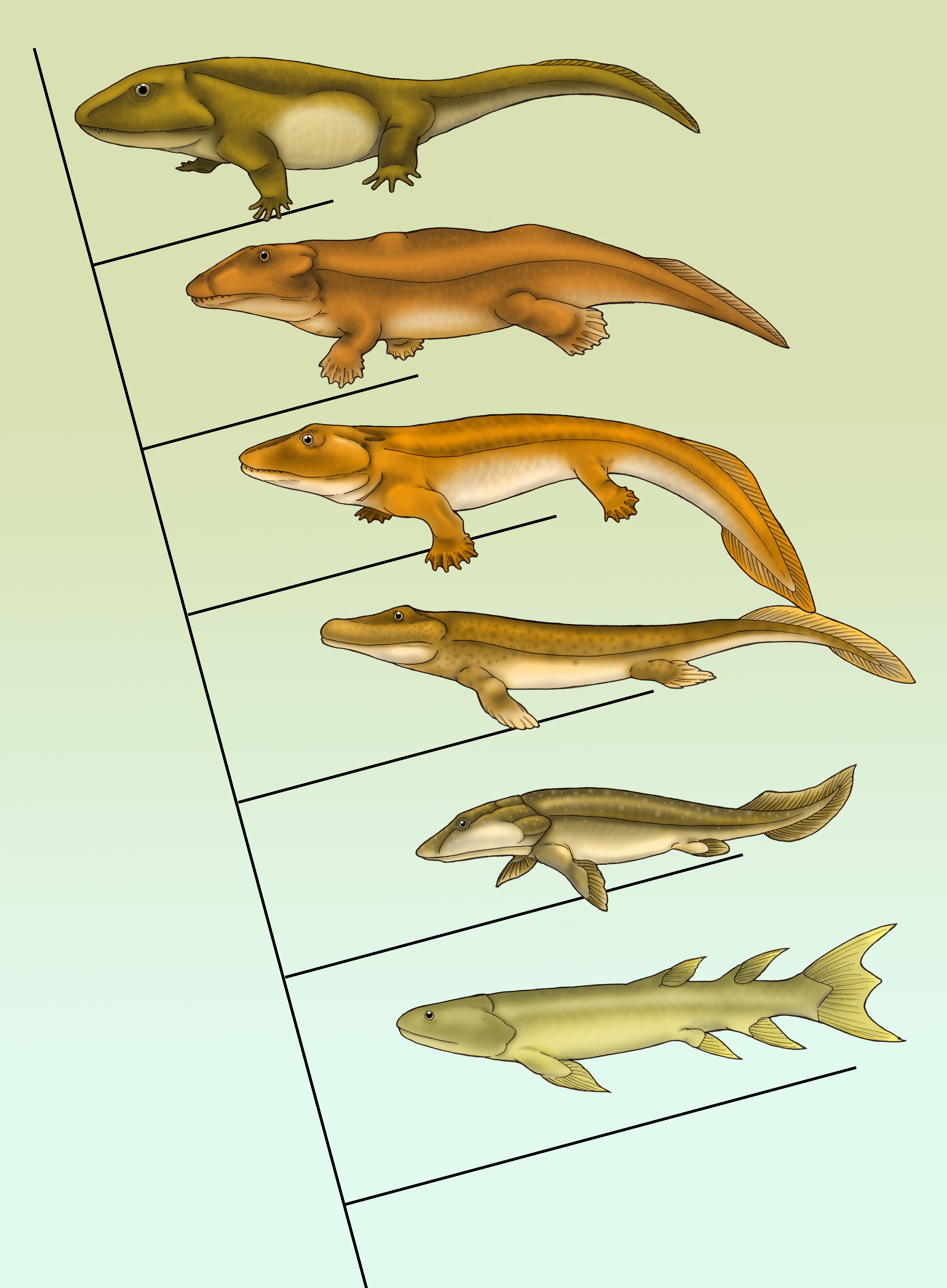
- Evolution of fish to tetrapods. The basic body plan has been phylogenetically constrained.
  Most terrestrial vertebrates have a body plan that consist of four limbs. The phylogenetic inertia hypothesis suggests that this body plan is observed, not because it happens to be optimal, but because tetrapods are derived from a clade of fishes (Sarcopterygii) which also have four limbs. Four limbs happened to be suitable means of locomotion, and so this body plan has not been selected against.
- Humans do not have optimal structure for bipedalism, because much of the human body plan originally evolved under quadrupedal locomotion, and has since been constrained because of phylogenetic inertia.

=== Modes of reproduction ===
Birds are the only speciose group of vertebrates that are exclusively oviparous, or egg laying. It has been suggested that birds are phylogenetically constrained, as being derived from reptiles, and likely have not overcome this constraint or diverged far enough away to develop viviparity, or live birth.

=== Homologous structures ===
- More specifically than the similarity in body plan, there are homologous bones across mammalian taxa. For example, the pentadactyl limb bone structure observed in the arms of primates, front legs of equestrians, in the wings of bats, and the flippers of seals. The fact that they are homologous is further evidence for phylogenetic inertia; these structures have been modified over time, but they are constrained by common ancestry.

Homologous bone structure in forelimbs of four vertebrates.

- All vertebrates share a homologous eye structure that effectively have a blind spot in them where the optic nerve attaches to the retina.

== Tests for phylogenetic inertia in study systems ==
There have been several studies that have been able to effectively test for phylogenetic inertia when looking into shared traits; predominantly with a comparative methods approach. Some have used comparative methods and found evidence for certain traits attributed to adaptation, and some to phylogeny; there were also numerous traits that could be attributed to both. Another study developed a new method of comparative examination that showed to be a powerful predictor of phylogenetic inertia in a variety of situations. It was called Phylogenetic Eigenvector Regression (PVR), which runs principal component analyses between species on a pairwise phylogenetic distance matrix. In another, different study, the authors described methods for measuring phylogenetic inertia, looked at effectiveness of various comparative methods, and found that different methods can reveal different aspects of drivers. Autoregression and PVR showed good results with morphological traits.
