= Iberoraphidia =

Iberoraphidia Temporal range: Lower Barremian Barremian

Scientific classification
- Domain: Eukaryota
- Kingdom: Animalia
- Phylum: Arthropoda
- Class: Insecta
- Order: Raphidioptera
- Family: †Mesoraphidiidae
- Genus: †Iberoraphidia
- Species: †I. dividua

Binomial name
- †Iberoraphidia dividua Jepson, Ansorge & Jarzembowski, 2011

Extinct genus of insects

Iberoraphidia is an extinct genus of snakefly in the family Mesoraphidiidae. The genus is solely known from a Cretaceous, Lower Barremian, fossil found in Spain. Currently the genus is composed of a single species, Iberoraphidia dividua.

== History and classification ==
Iberoraphidia dividua is known only from one fossil, the part and counterpart holotype, specimen number GZG.RF.7563. which is housed in the Geo-Sciences center of the University of Göttingen in Germany. The specimen is preserved as a compression fossil in lithographic limestone, dating to the Lower Barremian age, which was recovered from outcrops of the La Pedrera de Rúbies Formation formed by deposition of carbonate mud in a brackish or freshwater lagoon. The outcrop is located in the Serra del Montsec region near the town of Santa Maria de Meia, province of Lleida. Iberoraphidia was first studied by the paleoentomologists James E. Jepson and Edmund A. Jarzembowski from the United Kingdom and Jörg Ansorge from Germany. Their 2011 type description of the new genus and species was published in the entomology journal Palaeontology. The genus name Iberoraphidia was coined by the researchers as a combination of the snakefly genus Raphidia and "Ibero" which is in reference to the Iberian Peninsula where the type locality is. The specific epithet dividua is taken from the word "divided" and is a reference to the unique divided structure of the pterostigma.

== Description ==
The holotype is composed of a single fully complete adult forewing of 12.5 millimetres (0.49 in) in length with distinct macrotrichiae on both the C vein and parts of the R vein. The overall vein structure displayed by the specimen is most similar to that seen in the family Mesoraphidiidae, being distinctly simpler in structure then venation seen in the family Baissopteridae. Several features of the wing are used to distinguish Iberoraphidia from other Mesoraphidiidae genera. The wing possesses a fork of the MA and MP veins that is closer to the wing base then seen in most other genera, with only the genus Ororaphidia having a similar shift. Iberoraphidia can be further separated from both Ororaphidia and other Mesoraphidiids by the distinctly divided pterostigma. In total the pterostigma is over 1.7 millimetres (0.067 in) long, however the basal and apical sections are separated by a 1.7 centimetres (0.67 in) long middle cell.
