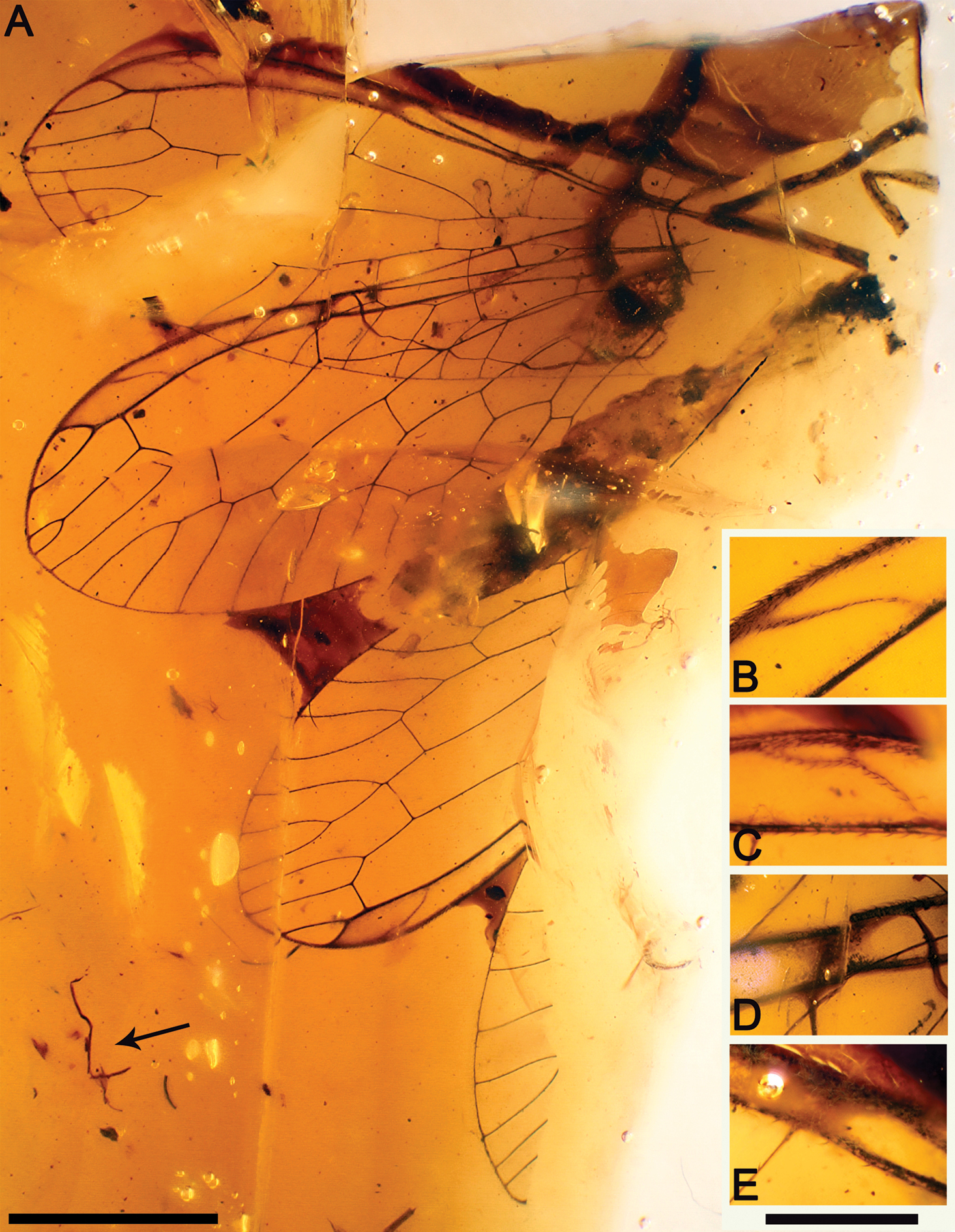

Scientific classification
- Domain: Eukaryota
- Kingdom: Animalia
- Phylum: Arthropoda
- Class: Insecta
- Order: Raphidioptera
- Family: †Mesoraphidiidae
- Genus: †Necroraphidia
- Species: †N. arcuata

Binomial name
- †Necroraphidia arcuata Pérez-de la Fuente, et al, 2012

= Necroraphidia =

Necroraphidia Temporal range: Albian 110 Ma

Extinct genus of insects

Necroraphidia is an extinct genus of snakefly in the family Mesoraphidiidae. The genus is solely known from Early Cretaceous, Albian age, fossil amber found in Spain. Currently the genus comprises a single species, Necroraphidia arcuata.

== History and classification ==
Necroraphidia arcuata is known only from one fossil, the holotype, specimen number CES 391.1. The specimen is composed of a partial isolated fore and hind-wings, leg segments, and a partial abdomen. All of the wings and the abdomen are covered in a mat of fungal hyphae. They are included in a specimen of amber with plant debris and a number of other insects, such as coleopteras, hymenopteras. and aphids. The fossil was recovered from outcrops of the Las Peñosas Formation in Rábago, part of the Cantabria autonomous community in Northern Spain. Necroraphidia was first studied by group of paleoentomologists led by Ricardo Pérez-de la Fuente of the University of Barcelona and including Enrique Peñalver, Xavier Delclòs, and Michael S. Engel. Their 2012 type description of the new genus and species was published in the electronic journal ZooKeys. The genus name Necroraphidia was coined by the researchers as a combination of the snakefly genus Raphidia and the Greek nekros meaning "dead". The specific epithet arcuata is derived from the Latin arcuatus, meaning "bent", a reference to the distinct structure of the pterostigmal crossvein. Necroraphidia arcuata is one of six described snakefly species found in the Albian deposits of Cantabria. Necroraphidia is most similar in character to Ororaphidia and Styporaphidia, both from the Jurassic of Mongolia.

== Description ==
The lone specimen of Necroraphidia arcuata is of a very fragmentary adult. The hyaline forewings are partially preserved and display brown vein structuring that hosts robust setae. The left forewing is the most complete, being approximately 6.9 millimetres (0.27 in) in length and a maximum of 2.7 millimetres (0.11 in) in width. The total estimated length for the forewings is less than 9 millimetres (0.35 in). Overall the legs show a striped pattern of dark and light patches. The femur has three distinct dark patches while the tibia has a darkened proximal area and a dark patch below the midpoint. The abdomen is 3.7 millimetres (0.15 in) long but details of the abdomen are obscured by the dense growth of fungal hyphae and some decomposition. The overall dimensions of the genus are smaller than either Ororaphidia or Styporaphidia. All three genera are noted for the pterostigmal region lacking a basal cross vein and instead being diffuse. Necroraphidia and Styporaphidia are separable by the cross veins in the pterostigma, with only one being found in Necroraphidia while Styporaphidia has two. The forewing of Ororaphidia is notably larger at 11.4 millimetres (0.45 in) and also displays distinct shapes to both the pterostigmal cross vein and second radial cell.
