= Lebanoraphidia =

Lebanoraphidia Temporal range: Barremian–Aptian 130 Ma

Scientific classification
- Kingdom: Animalia
- Phylum: Arthropoda
- Clade: Pancrustacea
- Class: Insecta
- Order: Raphidioptera
- Family: †Mesoraphidiidae
- Genus: †Lebanoraphidia
- Species: †L. nana

Binomial name
- †Lebanoraphidia nana Bechly & Wolf-Schwenninger, 2011

Extinct genus of insects

Lebanoraphidia is an extinct genus of snakefly in the family Mesoraphidiidae. The genus is solely known from Cretaceous, Upper Neocomian, fossil amber found in Lebanon. Currently the genus is composed of a single species Lebanoraphidia nana.

== History and classification ==
Lebanoraphidia nana is known only from two fossils, the holotype, specimen number SMNS LB-235-2, and the paratype, number SMNS LB-235-1, both of which are housed in the State Museum of Natural History Stuttgart in Germany. The specimens consist of partially complete adult insects with the holotype being of unidentified sex and the paratype being female. The specimens are preserved in transparent chunks of amber which have been embedded in artificial blocks of resin for study. The fossils were recovered from the outcrops of upper Neocomian rocks dating to about 130 million years old and yielding amber produced by kauri pines. The outcrops are in the area of Jezzine in southern Lebanon. Lebanoraphidia was first studied by the paleoentomologists Günter Bechly and Karin Wolf-Schwenninger, both of the State Museum of Natural History Stuttgart. Their 2011 type description of the new genus and species was published in the entomology journal Insect Systematics & Evolution. The genus name Lebanoraphidia was coined by the researchers as a combination of the snakefly genus Raphidia and "Lebano" which is in reference to the country of Lebanon where the genus was found. The specific epithet nana is taken from the Greek word "nanos" meaning dwarf. The name is a reference to the minute size of the adults. Lebanoraphidia nana is one of four described snakefly genera placed into the tribe Nanoraphidiini and the smallest described to date. The other three genera are Grimaldiraphidia, Cantabroraphidia, and the type genus Nanoraphidia.

== Description ==
The holotype specimen is an adult of unidentified sex due to the specimen missing all parts below the thorax. The paratype female is also incomplete, with the head missing, a white "slimy" growth along the abdomen and the thorax crushed. Overall the head capsule for the species is generally rhombohedral in outline with antennae composed of an estimated thirty eight flagellomeres. Unlike other members of the tribe, the pronotum of Lebanoraphidia is about 0.25 times longer than the head, in the other genera it is equal to or subequal to the head in length. The wings are mostly preserved, with the holotypes left forewing entire and the paratypes right hindwing only missing a section of vein structure. The other wings on both specimens are partial to completely missing. The complete forewing of the holotype shows a full length of 3.85 millimetres (0.152 in) and a maximum width of 1.28 millimetres (0.050 in), notably smaller than the other genera in Nanoraphidiini. The paratype specimens hindwing shows an overall length of 2.95 millimetres (0.116 in), while the holotype specimens has an overall length of 32 millimetres (1.3 in).
