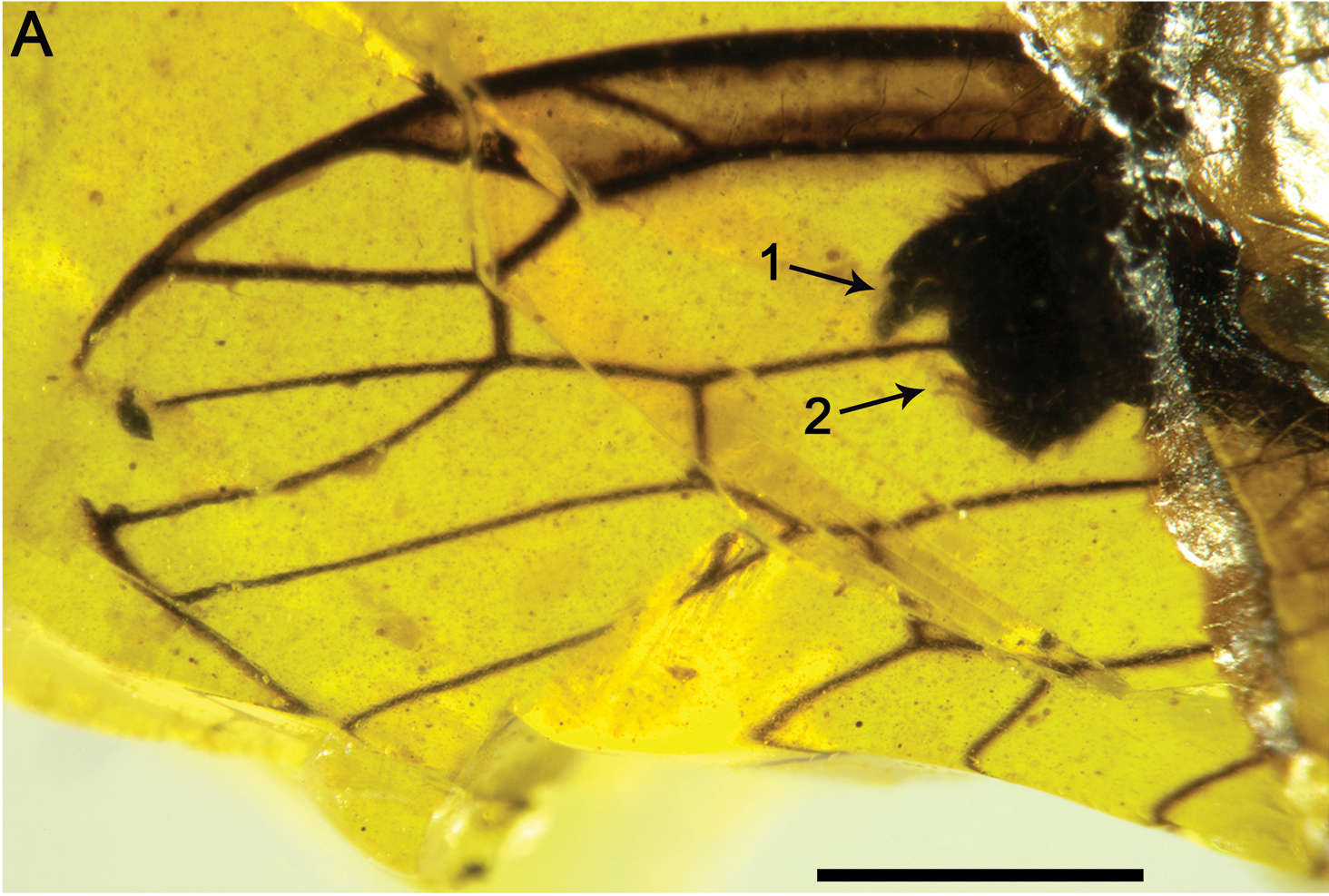
- S.? hispanica holotype

Scientific classification
- Kingdom: Animalia
- Phylum: Arthropoda
- Class: Insecta
- Order: Raphidioptera
- Family: †Mesoraphidiidae
- Genus: †Styporaphidia; Engel & Ren, 2008

Species
- S. magia; S.? hispanica

= Styporaphidia =

Styporaphidia Temporal range: Aalenian–Albian

Extinct genus of insects

Styporaphidia is a genus of snakefly, belonging to the extinct family Mesoraphidiidae, containing up to three species, the type species Styporaphidia magia, Styporaphidia willmanni and tentatively Styporaphidia? hispanica. The genus was named from the Greek stypos meaning "stem" or "stump" and Raphidia, the type genus for, and most often used as, a stem for generic names in the order Raphidioptera. The species name of S. magia is from the Greek word mageia meaning "magic" while the species name for S.? hispanica is from the Latin Hispania meaning "Spain" in reference to the type locality of the species.

== S. magia ==
S. magia is known from only the holotype, a single specimen of undetermined sex, deposited in the Department of Biology, Capital Normal University, Beijing, China as specimen number NNS-200202. Preserved as a compression fossil, the individual is fossilized in a resting position giving a top view to the body and wings. Paleontologiests Michael S. Engel and Dong Ren first studied and described S. magia and the co-occurring Ororaphidia and in 2008, publishing the type description in the Journal of the Kansas Entomological Society volume 81. The S. magia holotype was found in the near Daohugou Village, Inner Mongolia, China in strata belonging to the Jiulongshan Formation. This formation is dated to the early middle Jurassic and specifically Aalenian to Bajocian in age. The dating places S. magia and Ororaphidia as the oldest raphidiopterans known from China to date.

With no ovipositor present and the terminal section of the abdomen absent it is not possible to identify the sex of the holotype specimen. The overall length of S. magia is 13 millimetres (0.51 in) and has a forewing length of 10 millimetres (0.39 in). The head is longer than it is wide and is longer than the prothorax. Styporaphidia possesses the primitive feature of two crossveins in the pterostigma. This feature is found in some mesozoic genera of the Baissopteridae. However it can be distinguished from the baissopterids the lack of numerous crossveins in the radial and medial fields of the wings.

== S.? hispanica ==
S.? hispanica is also known only from a holotype, specimen number MCNA 9343. The specimen is composed of a partial isolated hindwing and a partial abdomen preserved in a small fragment of amber. The fossil was recovered from outcrops of the Escucha Formation in Moraza, part of the Province of Burgos in Northern Spain. S.? hispanica was first studied by group of paleoentomologists led by Ricardo Pérez-de la Fuente of the University of Barcelona and including Enrique Peñalver, Xavier Delclòs, and Michael S. Engel. Their 2012 type description of the species was published in the electronic journal ZooKeys.

While little of the single specimen is preserved, the tip of the abdomen shows the insect was a male. Due to the proximity of the hindwing and abdomen the two are assumed to belong to the same individual. The section of hindwing present is 3.5 millimetres (0.14 in) long and 2.5 millimetres (0.098 in) wide. Pérez-de la Fuente and coauthors tentatively placed the species into Styporaphidia based on the presence of two crossveins in the pterostigma. Two crossveins is a feature that is found in few described snakeflies and the preserved vein structure indicates placement within Mesoraphidiidae. Since the base of the pterostigma is not preserved it is not possible to firmly place the species into Styporaphidia. The two species are distinguished the finer details of the wing veins.

== S. willmanni ==
The holotype female for S. willmanni, CNU-RAP-LB-2017107 is preserved in the Capital Normal University College of Life Sciences collections in Beijing. The partially complete specimen is missing the distal half of the abdomen and most of the fore and hind wings on the left side.
