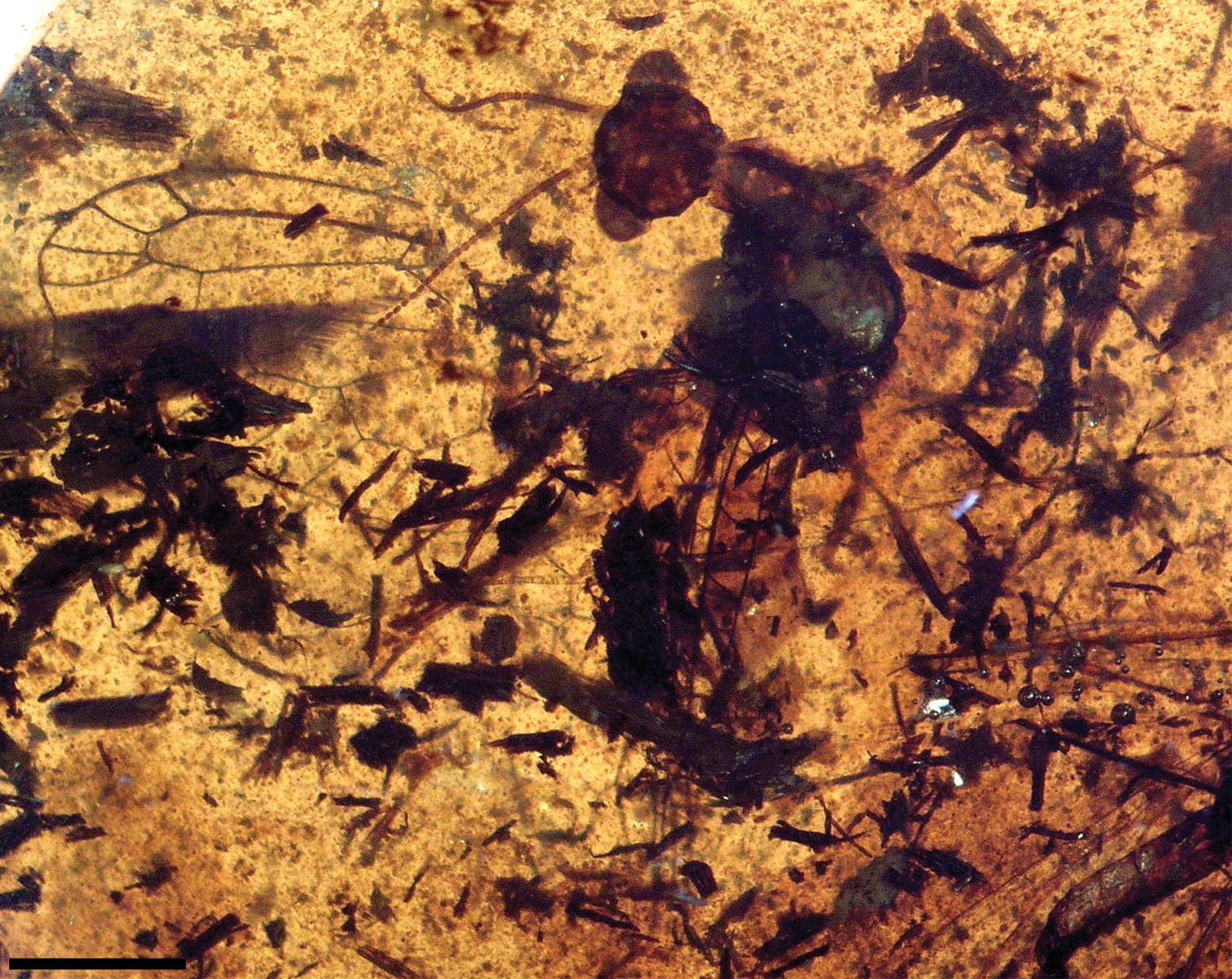

Scientific classification
- Kingdom: Animalia
- Phylum: Arthropoda
- Class: Insecta
- Order: Raphidioptera
- Family: †Mesoraphidiidae
- Genus: †Cantabroraphidia
- Species: †C. marcanoi

Binomial name
- †Cantabroraphidia marcanoi Pérez-de la Fuente, et al, 2010

= Cantabroraphidia =

Cantabroraphidia Temporal range: Albian 110 Ma

Extinct genus of insects

Cantabroraphidia is an extinct genus of snakefly in the family Mesoraphidiidae. The genus is solely known from fossil amber found in Cantabria, northern Spain, dating to the Albian age of the Early Cretaceous Period. Currently the genus comprises a single species Cantabroraphidia marcanoi.

== History and classification ==
Cantabroraphidia marcanoi is known only from one fossil, the holotype, specimen number ES-07-6, which is housed in the Museo Geominero in Madrid, Spain. The specimen is composed of an almost entirely complete adult insect of unidentified sex. Preserved in a transparent mass of amber, the specimen is fixed in association with a large amount of plant debris and one adult dipteran. Despite the amount of debris obscuring portions of the individual, enough details are present and visible to show the specimen was not from a previously described genus. The fossil was recovered from outcrops of the Las Peñosas Formation in the Cave of El Soplao near Rábago, part of the Cantabria autonomous community in Northern Spain. Cantabroraphidia was first studied by group of paleoentomologists led by Ricardo Pérez-de la Fuente of the University of Barcelona and including Enrique Peñalver, Xavier Delclòs, and André Nel. Their 2010 type description of the new genus and species was published in the French journal Annales de la Société Entomologique de France. The genus name Cantabroraphidia was coined by the researchers as a combination of the snakefly genus Raphidia and "Cantabria" which is in reference the Cantabria autonomous community where the outcrops that produced the fossil are located. The specific epithet marcanoi is from in honor of Francisco Javier López Marcano as recognition for his efforts to have the El Soplao ambers studied. Cantabroraphidia marcanoi is one of six described snakefly species found in the Albian deposits of Cantabria, and was the first Raphidiopteran to be described from El Soplao.

== Description ==
The lone specimen of Cantabroraphidia marcanoi is a nearly complete adult. The hyaline forewings are partially preserved and display brown vein structuring that hosts strong setae. While partial, the forewings are complete enough to show the full length to be 5.5 millimetres (0.22 in) and a maximum of 1.8 millimetres (0.071 in) in width. The elongated pterostigma is faintly infumate,1.4 millimetres (0.055 in) long and lacks crossveins except for the basal crossvein that closes the cell. Excluding the prothorax most of the thorax and all of the abdomen were crushed prior to entombment in the liquid sap. As such very little can be determined about these areas of the insect. Overall the thorax and abdomen appear to be of similar length as the prothorax and head. One of the few identifiable characteristics on the top of the prothorax is a small line of spines along the front edge.
