= Ororaphidia =

Ororaphidia Temporal range: Aalenian–Bajocian

Scientific classification
- Kingdom: Animalia
- Phylum: Arthropoda
- Clade: Pancrustacea
- Class: Insecta
- Order: Raphidioptera
- Family: †Mesoraphidiidae
- Genus: †Ororaphidia; Engel & Ren, 2008

Species
- O. megalocephala Engel & Ren, 2008; O. bifurcata Lyu, Ren & Liu, 2017

Extinct genus of insects

Ororaphidia is an extinct genus of snakefly containing two species: the type species Ororaphidia megalocephala and Ororaphidia bifurcata.

== History and classification ==
Doctors Michael S. Engel and Dong Ren first studied and described Ororaphidia and the co-occurring Styporaphidia and in 2008, publishing a formal description in the Journal of the Kansas Entomological Society volume 81. The genus name comes from the Greek oros meaning "mountain" and Raphidia, the type genus for, and most often used as, a stem for generic names in the order Raphidioptera. The species name is a combination of the Greek words megalose meaning "very large" and kephale meaning "head" and is in reference to the notably large size of the head capsule compared to other raphidiopterans.

== Description ==
The genus is known from only the holotype, a single female specimen, deposited in the Department of Biology, Capital Normal University, Beijing, China as specimen number NNS-200201. Preserved as a compression fossil, the female individual is fossilized in a resting position giving a top view to the body and wings. The Ororaphidia holotype was found in the near Daohugou Village, Inner Mongolia, China from the Jiulongshan Formation. The formation is dated as early middle Jurassic, specifically Aalenian to Bajocian in age. This dating places Ororaphidia and Styporaphidia as the oldest raphidiopterans known from China. Excluding the ovipositor which is short and does not pass the wingtips, Ororaphidia is 12 millimetres (0.47 in) and has a forewing length of 11.4 millimetres (0.45 in). The head is longer than it is wide and is slightly longer than the prothorax. Ororaphidia has wing venation which while superficially similar to some Mesoraphidia genera, it can be distinguished by a number of differences including a pterostigmal cross vein and the noticeably short ovipositor.
