= Cave of El Soplao =

Cave in Cantabria, Spain

Cave of El Soplao Cueva de El Soplao Cueva d'El Sopláu
- Location within Spain
- Location: Rionansa, Valdáliga and Herrerías municipalities, Cantabria, Spain
- Nearest city: San Vicente de la Barquera
- Coordinates: 43°17′47″N 4°24′36″W

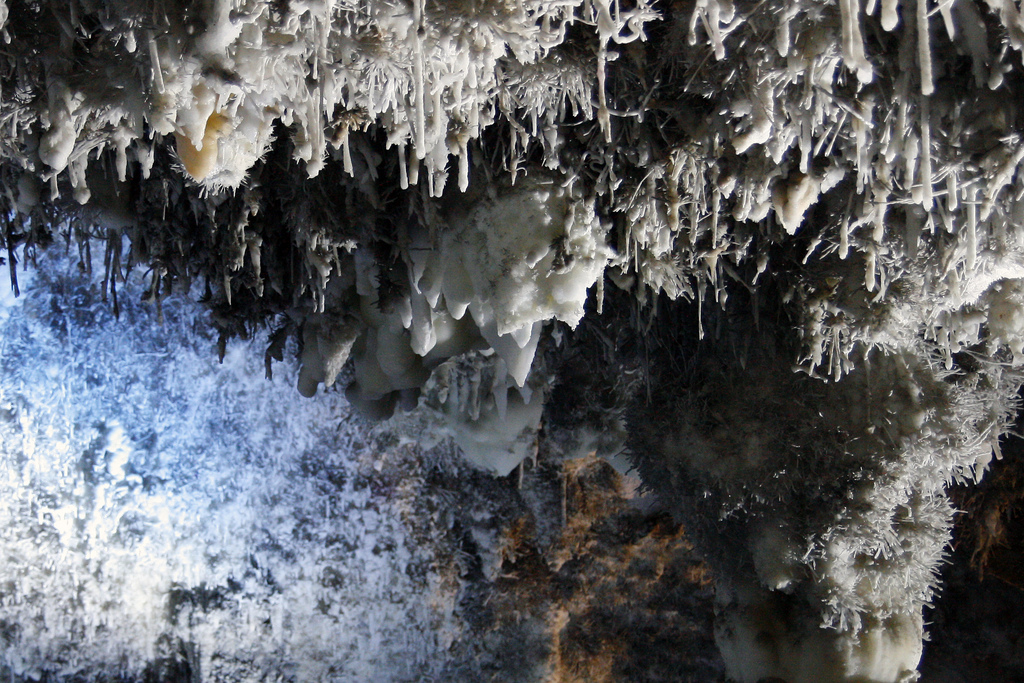
Helictites of calcite in the vaults of the cave

El Soplao (Cantabrian: El Sopláu) is a cave located in the municipalities of Rionansa, Valdáliga and Herrerías in Cantabria, Spain. It is considered unique for the quality and quantity of geological formations (speleothems) in its 17 miles length, 6 of which are open to the public. In it are formations such as helictites and draperies. Its formation dates back to the Mesozoic, in particular the Cretaceous period 240 million years ago. The entrance is at 540 metres in the Sierra Soplao Arnero.

The cave was accidentally discovered during drilling for mining, subsequently being exploited for the extraction of minerals. During its operation, many local families were supported by the income they got from the mining, combined with farming livestock. After decades of neglect, speleology, and in particular the Cantabria University Speleology Club since 1975, have discovered its true geological value.

On July 1, 2005 the Government of Cantabria opened it to the public and publicised it internationally, after development for tourism and protection rules prohibiting any further activity by the discovering club. Research is ongoing, resulting in the study of amber deposits, the recognition of underground stromatolites formed by manganese-oxidising bacteria, and a new mineral form, zaccagnaite-3R.

The cave recently started holding music concerts. Artists like Bertín Osborne and Nando Agüeros have played inside the cave for hundreds of people in 2016.

El Soplao is just one of at least 6,500 caves in Cantabria.

== Situation ==
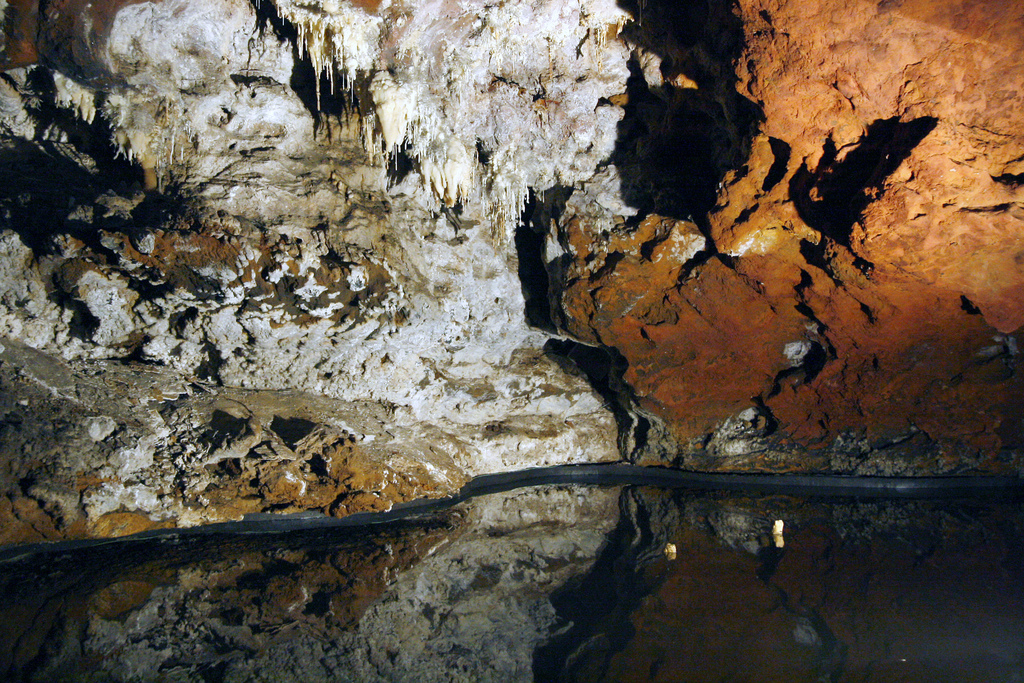
Inside the cave of El Soplao

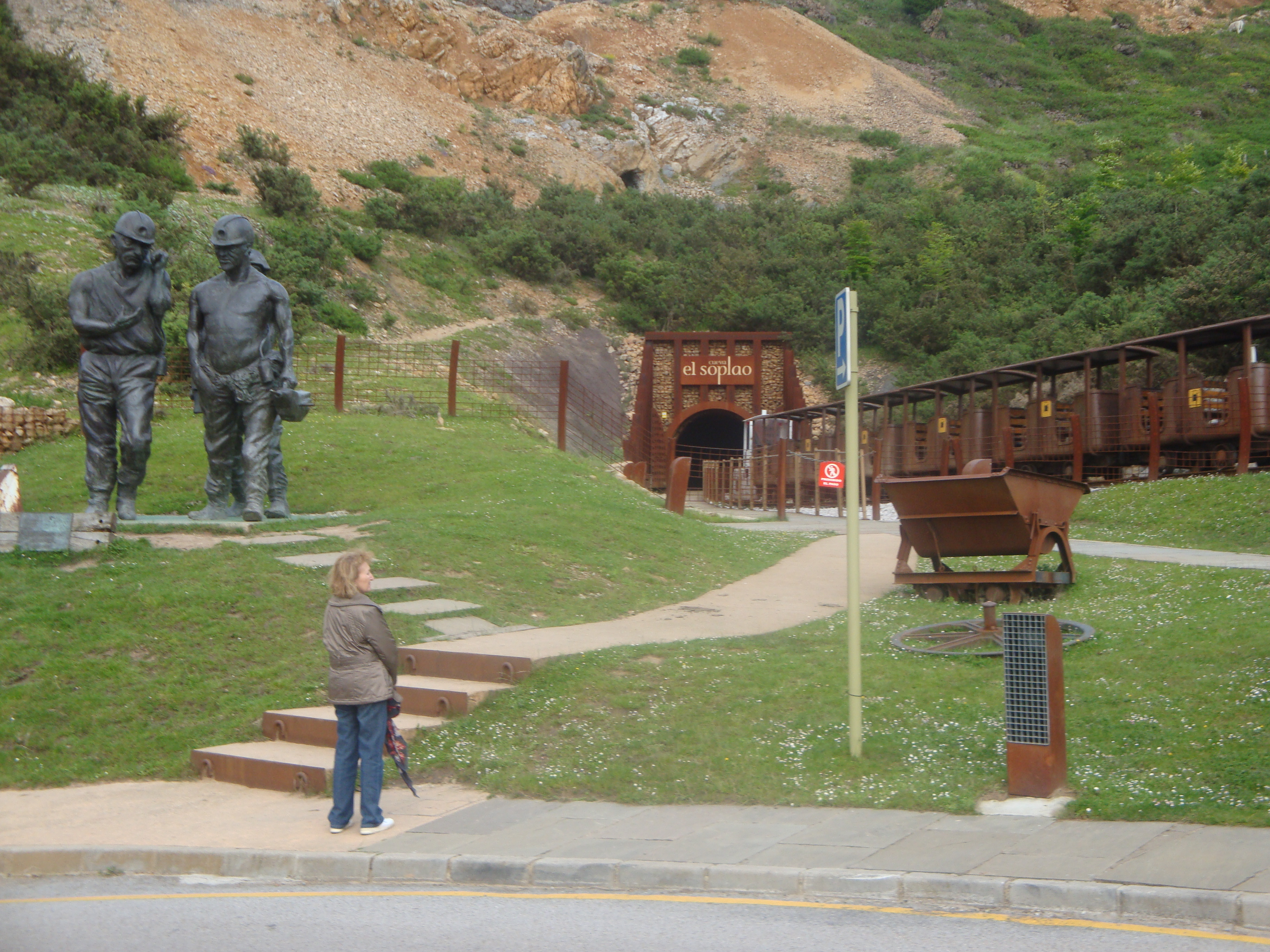
Access to the cave in Arnero Mountains, 540 metres above sea level

The cave is located in the "mi bater", part of the Sierra del Escudo de Cabuérniga, between the towns of Rionansa, Herrerías and Valdáliga and around San Vicente de la Barquera. The Sierra de Arnero runs parallel to the Cantabrian Sea, with a maximum altitude of 682 metres.

To access the cave, visitors can use the Cantabrian motorway.

== Galleries ==
El Soplao is a very extensive network of caves and developed at several levels. Cave metrics (December 2003) are: http://www.microbemagazine.org/index.php/05-2011-current-topics/3353-manganese-oxidizing-microbes-form-giant-stromatolites-in-caves

- Length of natural passages surveyed (12,585 metres).
- Length of mined passage connected with the cave (3,240 metres).
- Lacuerre Caves (2,927 metres).
- Total System length (17,852 metres).

=== Gallery of the Ghosts ===
It is a natural room containing numerous thick white stalagmite formations rising from the ground which resemble ghosts, hence the name of the gallery. The gallery is 350 metres long and some areas reaching 35 metres wide. It was used in the early twentieth century as a place of extraction and storage by the mineral miners of La Florida.

=== Gallery Gorda ===
It is a room with a natural underground lake and one of the largest in terms of volume. This is the first gallery to be accessed Soplao. The name comes from the impression of smallness due to one of the cavers who investigated the caves. It has a lighting system that highlights the colours of the stalactite from the ceiling, covered with calcite helictitas.

=== Gallery of the False Floor ===
Small chamber where large rock formations in the form of thin threads that are screwed everywhere.

=== Gallery of the Camp ===
Is of moderate dimensions, with widths up to 10 metres. The name comes from the installation of a research camp during the first raids. Here it remained unbroken 208 hours Speleo Club members Cantabria highlight the cast, dyed red and white minerals in the area.

=== Gallery of the Cauliflower ===
Stand, rather than stalactites, stalagmites huge, often eccentric, that they tend to join at the end with the roof. Can be seen traces of an earthquake that hit the spot.

=== Gallery of the Forest ===
High gallery which takes its name from its resemblance to a natural forest. The cast and the union of stalactites and stalagmites happen everywhere, creating large and varied columns. As in the Galería of the Cauliflower can be seen traces of an earthquake.

=== Gallery Genesis ===
Located to the east. It is one of the highest, reaching 30 metres high. Its length exceeds 160 metres. Notable cast sheets, giant stalagmites pisolitic nests. Its name comes from the number of colours displayed on it, because of the variety of salts dissolved in water.

=== Other galleries ===
- Gallery of Bridge
- Gallery of the Mermaid
- Gallery Columns
- Gallery Grey
- Gallery of the Avalanche
- Gallery of the Goat
- Gallery the Wonders
- Gallery Wet

== Mineral and fossils ==
This is the list of minerals and fossils found in the cave, in alphabetical order:

=== Fossils ===
- Amarantoraphidia ventolina
- Amber
- Black amber
- Cantabroraphidia marcanoi
- Necroraphidia arcuata

=== Minerals ===
- Aragonite
- Calcite
- dolomite
- Sphalerite
- Galena
- Marcasite
- Pyrite

== See also ==
- Caves in Cantabria

== Bibliography ==
- Francisco Fernández Ortega and Maria del Carmen Urioste Valls, El Soplao fantasy in the darkness, Creatic Publishing (2007).
- John Hill (between others), El Soplao, a unique cavity, Creatic Editions (2003).
