= Proraphidia =

Proraphidia Temporal range: Late Jurassic–Barremian

Scientific classification
- Domain: Eukaryota
- Kingdom: Animalia
- Phylum: Arthropoda
- Class: Insecta
- Order: Raphidioptera
- Family: †Mesoraphidiidae
- Genus: †Proraphidia; Martynova, 1941

Species
- Proraphidia gomezi; Proraphidia hopkinsi; Proraphidia turkestanica

Extinct genus of insects

Proraphidia is a genus of snakefly in the extinct family Mesoraphidiidae. The genus currently contains three species; Proraphidia gomezi from the La Pedrera de Rúbies Formation in Spain, Proraphidia hopkinsi from the Weald Clay in England, and the type species Proraphidia turkestanica from Kazakhstan. The genus was first described by O. M. Martynova in 1941 with the publication of P. turkestanica from Jurassic deposits of the Karabastau Formation in Karatau, Kazakhstan.

All species in the genus are noted for the small size of the pterostigma when compared to other raphidiopteran species. P. hopkinsi and P. gomezi were described by James E. Jepson and Edmund A. Jarzembowski in a 2008 paper published in the journal Alavesia. P. hopkinsi is known from a fossil found in deposits of the Lower Weald Clay at the Clockhouse Brickworks in Surrey, England. The deposits date to the Late Hauterivian stage of the Lower Cretaceous. The P. hopkinsi holotype is described from a single forewing that is 11.5 millimetres (0.45 in) long preserved in a section of siltstone concretion also containing Blattodea, Hemiptera, Mecoptera, and Diptera specimens. The wing is narrower than P. turkestanica, with three crossveins between the R and Sc veins, and the second branch of the CuA forked. The type specimen is housed in the Booth Museum of Natural History at Brighton, England, as specimen number "BMB 014915, - 8". P. hopkinsi was named in honor of Dick Hopkins, a long-time volunteer of the Booth Museum.

The holotype of Proraphidia gomezi is a partial body with overlapping fore and hind wings preserved in Early Barremian-age limestone from deposits at Pedrera de Meià in Rúbies, Spain. The forewings are 13 millimetres (0.51 in) long while the hindwings are notably shorter than P. turkestanica and have fewer veinlets in the coastal region. Named for Mr Gómez-Pallerola, a fossil collector and contributor to the Institut d'Estudis Ilerdencs in Lleida, Catalonia (Spain) where the holotype of P. gomezi, specimen number "L. 29" is housed. A fourth species, from the Upper Jurassic/Lower Cretaceous sediments at Baisa, Buryatia, Russia, was previously placed in Proraphidia by Dr. Martynova in 1961 as Proraphidia vitimica. However the species was subsequently moved to Alloraphidia in 1993 by Dr. Alexandr G. Ponomarenko. The species was then placed in its current genus Pararaphidia as Pararaphidia vitimica by Dr. Michael Engel in 2002.
