= Austroraphidia =

Austroraphidia Temporal range: Early Cretaceous

Scientific classification
- Domain: Eukaryota
- Kingdom: Animalia
- Phylum: Arthropoda
- Class: Insecta
- Order: Raphidioptera
- Family: †Baissopteridae
- Genus: †Austroraphidia
- Species: †A. brasiliensis

Binomial name
- †Austroraphidia brasiliensis Nel et al., 1990

Extinct genus of insects

Austroraphidia is an extinct genus of snakefly in the family of Baissopteridae. Austroraphidia fossils were described by Willmann in 1994. The genus was later described by Michael S. Engel in 2002. It has five sister taxa; Baissoptera, Cretinocellia, Cretoraphidia, Cretoraphidiopsis and Lugala. Its fossils were found at the Crato MNHN collection in Brazil, often known as the Cretaceous of Brazil. It contains one species, the extinct Austroraphidia brasiliensis, which was described by Nel et al. in 1990. Its average body length is 12.3 centimetres (4.8 in), the forewing is 10.2 by 3.0 centimetres (4.0 in × 1.2 in) and the hindwing is 9.5 by 2.88 centimetres (3.74 in × 1.13 in).
