= Dichomeris lucrifuga =

Scientific classification
- Kingdom: Animalia
- Phylum: Arthropoda
- Class: Insecta
- Order: Lepidoptera
- Family: Gelechiidae
- Genus: Dichomeris
- Species: D. lucrifuga

Binomial name
- Dichomeris lucrifuga Meyrick, 1923

Species of moth

Dichomeris lucrifuga is a moth in the family Gelechiidae. It was described by Edward Meyrick in 1923. It is found in Pará, Brazil.

The wingspan is about 9 mm (0.35 in). The forewings are of a light, brownish, ochreous hue sprinkled with black. The stigmata are moderate, blackish, the plical obliquely before first the discal. There is a short blackish mark on the costa at two-thirds and a small irregular dark grey spot almost at the apex. There is also a marginal series of black dots around the posterior part of the costa and termen. The hindwings are grey.
