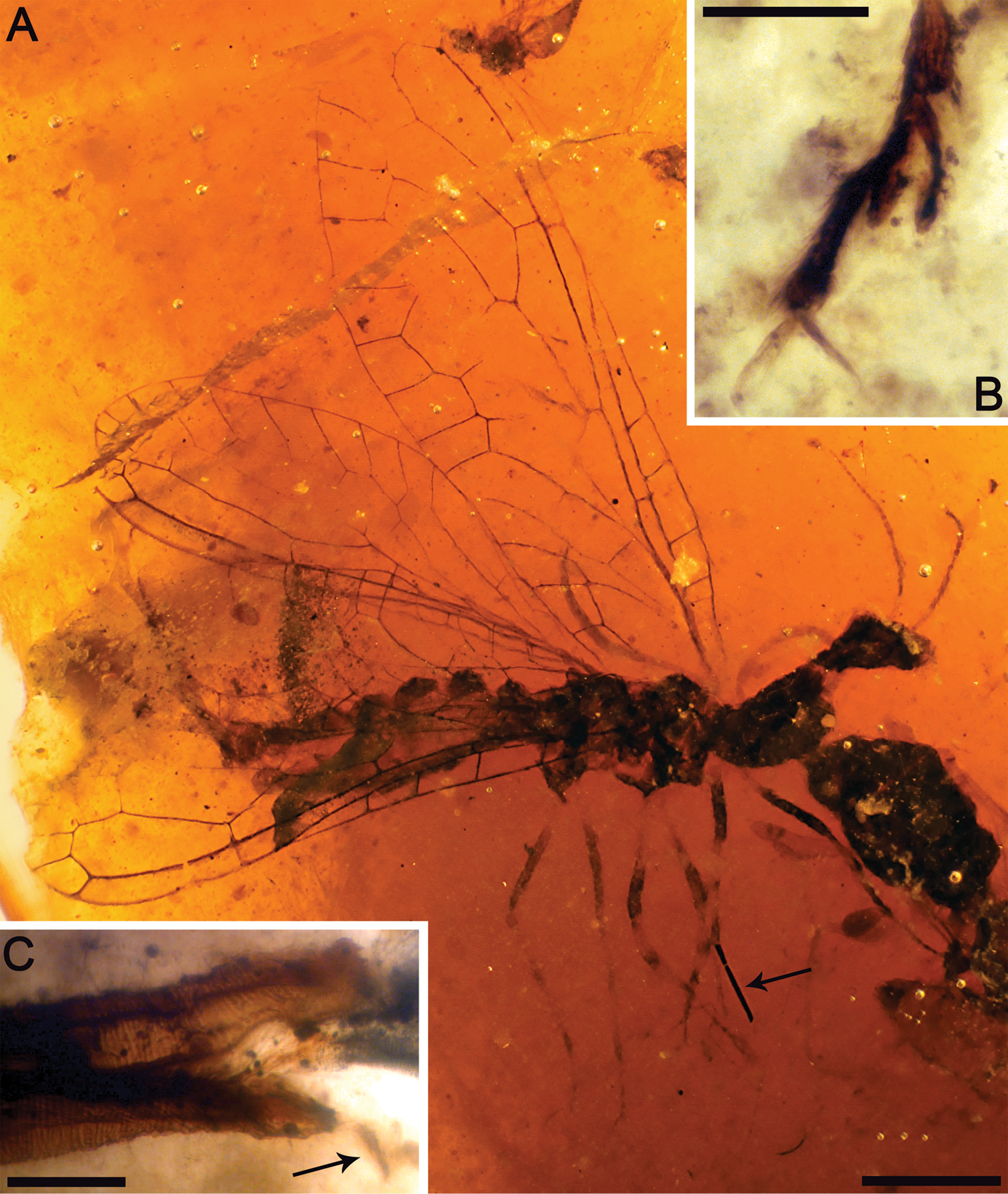

Scientific classification
- Domain: Eukaryota
- Kingdom: Animalia
- Phylum: Arthropoda
- Class: Insecta
- Order: Raphidioptera
- Family: †Mesoraphidiidae
- Genus: †Amarantoraphidia
- Species: †A. ventolina

Binomial name
- †Amarantoraphidia ventolina Pérez-de la Fuente, et al, 2012

= Amarantoraphidia =

Amarantoraphidia Temporal range: Albian 110 Ma

Extinct genus of insects

Amarantoraphidia is an extinct genus of snakefly in the family Mesoraphidiidae. The genus is solely known from Early Cretaceous, Albian age, fossil amber found in Spain. Currently the genus comprises only a single species Amarantoraphidia ventolina.

== History and classification ==
Amarantoraphidia ventolina is known only from one fossil, the holotype, specimen number CES 364.1. The specimen is composed of a mostly complete adult insect with the wing tips missing. The apical third of the right hindwing is also gone and the left front most leg has been disarticulated. The specimen is included in a piece of amber with plant debris and a number of other insects, such as a thysanopteran, hymenopterans. and dipterans. The fossil was recovered from outcrops of the Escucha Formation in Moraza, part of the Province of Burgos in northern Spain. Amarantoraphidia was first studied by group of paleoentomologists led by Ricardo Pérez-de la Fuente of the University of Barcelona and including Enrique Peñalver, Xavier Delclòs, and Michael S. Engel. Their 2012 type description of the new genus and species was published in the electronic journal ZooKeys. The genus name Amarantoraphidia was coined by the researchers as a combination of the snakefly genus Raphidia and the Greek amarantos meaning "ageless" or "that never fades". The specific epithet ventolina is a reference to the Cantabrian mythologies ventolines. These were said to be cheerful air beings with warm green wings which helped fishermen when summoned. Amarantoraphidia ventolina is one of six described snakefly species found in the Albian deposits of Cantabria.

== Description ==
The lone specimen of Amarantoraphidia ventolina is a fairly well preserved adult female. The hyaline forewings are partially preserved, displaying brown vein structuring that hosts robust setae, notably along the C-vein. The forewings are incomplete, with the tip beyond the end of the pterostigma not present. As such the overall length is estimated to have been 5.6 millimetres (0.22 in) in length and a maximum of 1.9 millimetres (0.075 in) in width. The pterostigma is elongated with a slightly infumate and has a base end closed with a cross vein. Other than the basal cross vein the pterostigma is not crossed by any veins. Overall the legs show a striped pattern of dark and light patches. The tibia have three distinct dark patches while the femora have a light proximal half and darkened apical half. The integument is a dark brown in color. The abdomen is 2.4 millimetres (0.094 in) long and sports a robust ovipositor that has dense annulations along its length. The ovipositor is 1.7 millimetres (0.067 in) long, 0.1 millimetres (0.0039 in) thick, and sports short, stiff, sensory setae along its length.
