= Nanoraphidia =

Nanoraphidia Temporal range: Barremian - Cenomanian
- Nanoraphidia electroburmica female in Burmese amber

Scientific classification
- Kingdom: Animalia
- Phylum: Arthropoda
- Clade: Pancrustacea
- Class: Insecta
- Order: Raphidioptera
- Family: †Mesoraphidiidae
- Genus: †Nanoraphidia; Engel, 2002

Type species
- Nanoraphidia electroburmica Engel, 2002

Species
- Nanoraphidia electroburmica Engel, 2002; Nanoraphidia lithographica Jepson et al. 2011

Extinct genus of insects

Nanoraphidia is an extinct genus of snakefly in the family Mesoraphidiidae containing the species Nanoraphidia electroburmica and Nanoraphidia lithographica.

The genus name is derived from a combination of the Greek nanos (dwarf) and the snakefly genus Raphidia, and the type species name from the Latin electrum (amber) and Burma, the former name of Myanmar. The type species is known from the holotype, a single, partial adult, now deposited in the American Museum of Natural History as specimen number Bu-092., and several additional specimens. The amber specimen is from deposits in Tanai Village, Kachin State 105 kilometres (65 mi) northwest of Myitkyina, Myanmar. The specimen has a badly disarticulated thorax and abdomen, which are present in the amber as integumental debris, however the head, wings, and anterior legs are in good condition. Nanoraphidia electroburmica is the smallest known Raphidioptera species, living or extinct, the fore wings being only 4.2 millimetres (0.17 in) long. The second species is named after the lithographic limestone of the La Pedrera de Rúbies Formation in Spain where it was found.

The genus is also the first to be described from a specimen of Old World amber. Nanoraphidia is separable from other Mesoraphidiidae genera by the small size of specimens and distinct vein structure of the wings. The wings have an expanded costal area which is similar in appearance to the costal areas in Cretinocellia and Lugala. Both of these genera, however, belong to the Baissopteridae family and have many more crossveins and cells between Rs and M veins. The specimen shows N. electroburmica to have had a brown coloration to the body and a hyaline appearance to the wings.
