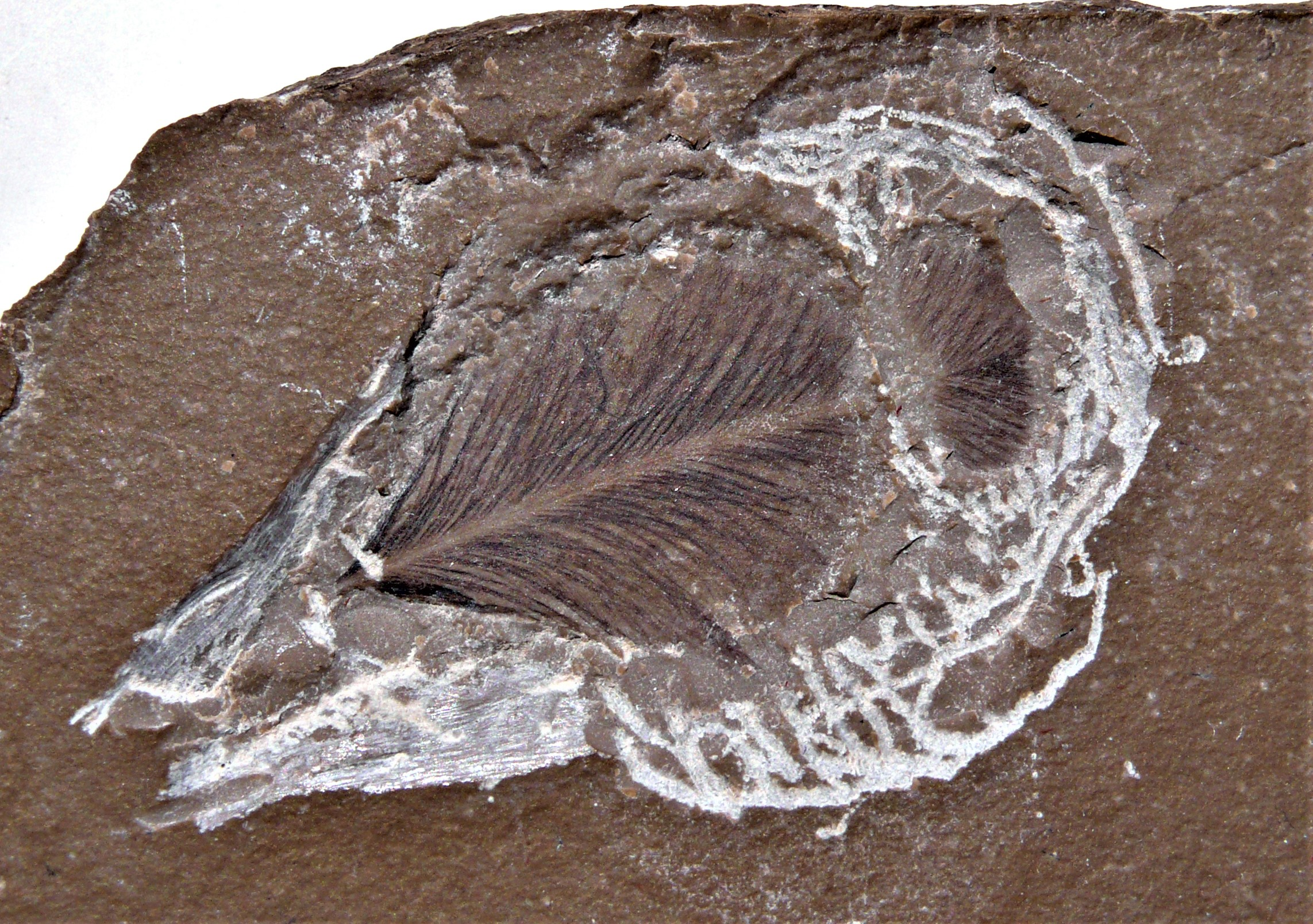

Scientific classification
- Kingdom: Animalia
- Phylum: Chordata
- Class: Reptilia
- Clade: Dinosauria
- Clade: Saurischia
- Clade: Theropoda
- Clade: Avialae
- Clade: †Enantiornithes
- Genus: †Ilerdopteryx; Lacasa-Ruiz, 1985
- Species: †I. viai

Binomial name
- †Ilerdopteryx viai Lacasa-Ruiz, 1985

= Ilerdopteryx =

Ilerdopteryx Temporal range: Early Cretaceous, 140–125 Ma

Extinct genus of birds

Ilerdopteryx is an extinct genus of birds, perhaps an enantiornithine, from the Lower Cretaceous La Pedrera de Rúbies Formation lithographic limestone of Spain. The type species, I. viai, is known only from a collection of isolated contour feathers.
