= La Pedrera de Rúbies Formation =

Early Cretaceous geologic formation in Catalonia, Spain

- Stratigraphic range: Late Berriasian-early Barremian; ~140–125 Ma
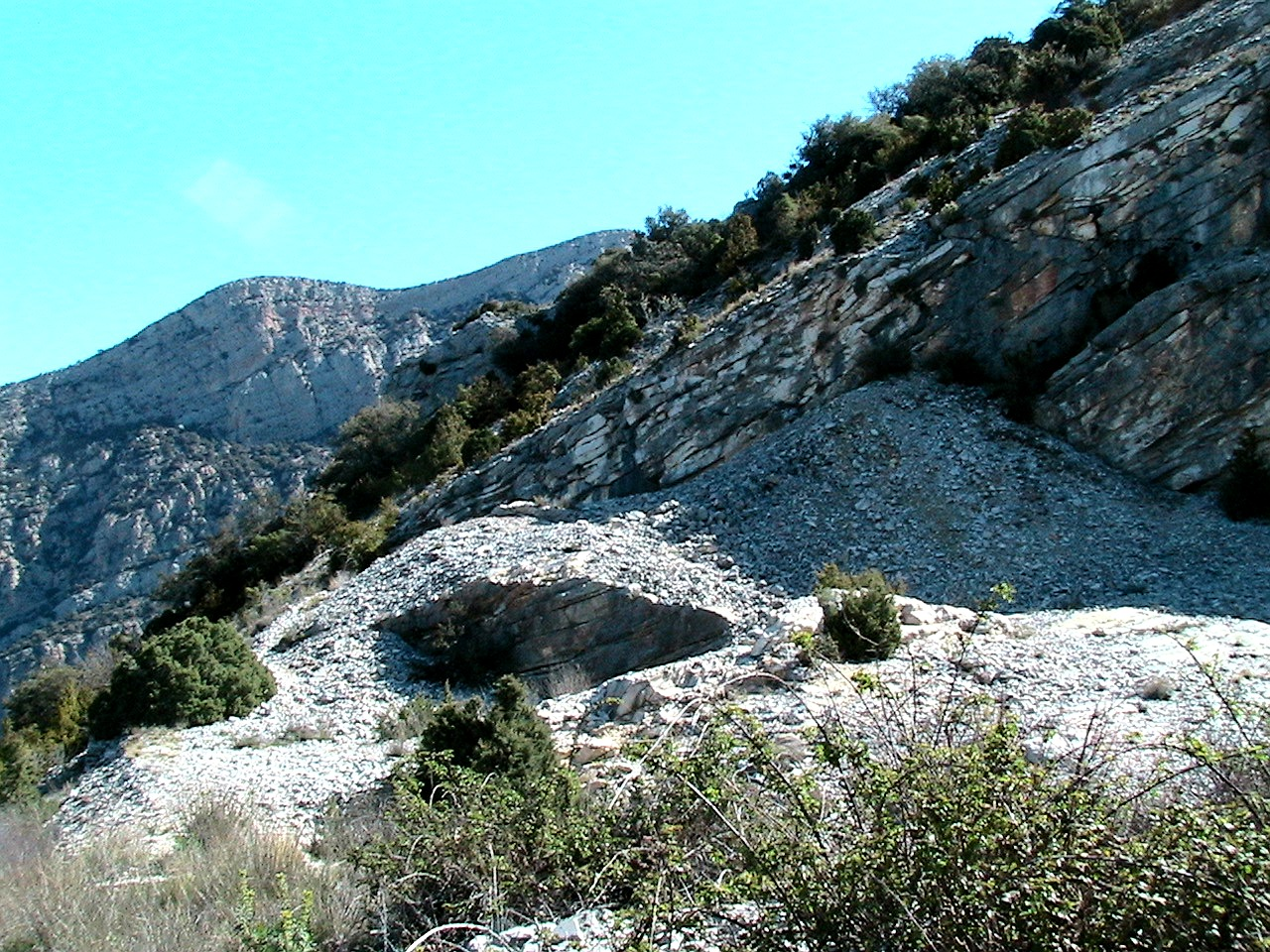
- Exposure of the La Pedrera de Rúbies Formation at La Pedrera de Meià
- Type: Geological formation
- Unit of: Montsec Group
- Underlies: Prada Formation
- Area: Montsec

Lithology
- Primary: Limestone

Location
- Coordinates: 42.0°N 0.9°E
- Approximate paleocoordinates: 31.3°N 11.3°E
- Region: Lérida Province, Catalonia
- Country: Spain
- Extent: Pre-Pyrenees
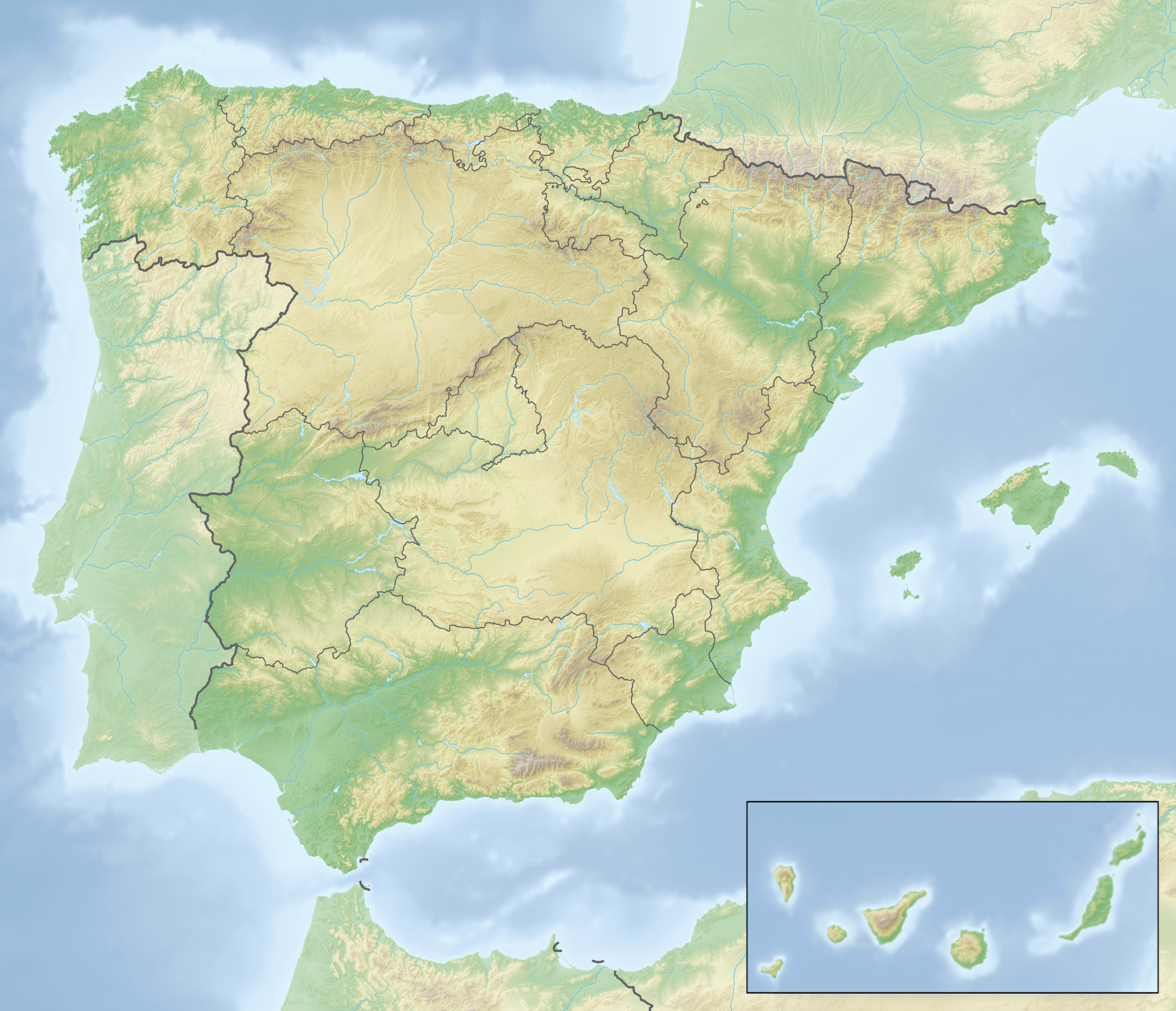
- La Pedrera de Rúbies Formation (Spain) La Pedrera de Rúbies Formation (Province of Lleida)

The La Pedrera de Rúbies Formation, also called as La Pedrera de Meià is an Early Cretaceous (late Berriasian to early Barremian geologic formation in Catalonia, Spain. The formation crops out in the area of the Montsec in the Organyà Basin. At the La Pedrera de Meià locality, the formation consists of rhythmically laminated, lithographic limestones that formed in the distal areas of a large, shallow coastal lake. It is noted for the exceptional preservation of articulated small vertebrates and insects, similar to that of the Solnhofen Limestone.

== Fossil content ==
The La Pedrera de Rúbies Formation has yielded the enantiornithine bird Noguerornis and the scincogekkomorph lizard Pedrerasaurus, and two species of Teiid lizard Meyasaurus, M. fauri and M. crusafonti, the indeterminate avialan Ilerdopteryx, frogs Neusibatrachus wilferti, Eodiscoglossus santonjae and Montsechobatrachus. A crocodyliform Montsecosuchus and many insects and other arthropods, as:

- Angarosphex lithographicu
- Archisphex catalunicus
- Artitocoblatta hispanica
- Chalicoridulum montsecensis
- Chrysobothris ballae
- Cionocoleus longicapitis
- Condalia woottoni
- Cretephialtites pedrerae
- Hirmoneura (Eohirmoneura) neli
- Hirmoneura richterae
- Iberoraphidia dividua
- Ilerdocossus pulcherrima
- Ilerdosphex wenzae
- Jarzembowskia edmundi
- Leridatoma pulcherrima
- Manlaya lacabrua
- Meiagaster cretaceus
- Meiatermes bertrani
- Mesoblattina colominasi
- Mesopalingea lerida
- Mimamontsecia cretacea
- Montsecbelus solutus
- Nanoraphidia lithographica
- Nogueroblatta fontllongae
- N. nana
- Pachypsyche vidali
- Pompilopterus montsecensis
- Proraphidia gomezi
- Prosyntexis montsecensis
- Pseudochrysobothris ballae
- Ptiolinites almuthae
- Vitisma occidentalis
- Cretaholocompsa montsecana
- Montsecosphex jarzembowskii
- Cretobestiola hispanica
- Angarosphex penyalveri
- Cretoserphus gomezi
- Bolbonectus lithographicus
- ?Anaglyphites pluricavus
- Palaeaeschna vidali
- Hispanochlorogomphus rossi
- Palaeouloborus lacasae
- Ichthyemidion vivaldi

== Correlation ==
Early Cretaceous stratigraphy of Iberia
Ma	Age	Paleomap \ Basins	Cantabrian	Olanyà	Cameros	Maestrazgo	Oliete	Galve	Morella	South Iberian	Pre-betic	Lusitanian
100	Cenomanian		La Cabana	Sopeira	Utrillas		Mosquerela					Caranguejeira
100	Cenomanian		Altamira	Sopeira	Utrillas							Caranguejeira
100	Cenomanian		Eguino	Sopeira	Utrillas							Caranguejeira
125	Albian		Ullaga - Balmaseda	Lluçà	Utrillas					Traiguera		Caranguejeira
125	Albian		Monte Grande	Lluçà	Escucha		Escucha			Jijona		Caranguejeira
125	Albian		Itxina - Miono	Lluçà	Escucha		Escucha					Caranguejeira
125	Aptian		Valmaseda - Tellamendi	Lluçà	Ol Gp. - Castrillo	Benassal	Escucha	Benassal				Olhos
125	Aptian		Valmaseda - Tellamendi	Font	En Gp. - Leza	Morella/Oliete	Oliete	Villaroya	Morella	Capas; Rojas		Almargem
125	Aptian		Patrocinio - Ernaga	Senyús	En Gp. - Jubela	Forcall			Morella	Villaroya	Upper; Bedoulian	Figueira
125	Barremian		Vega de Pas	Cabó	Abejar	Xert	Alacón	Xert	Morella	Huérguina	Upper; Bedoulian	Assises
125	Barremian		Vega de Pas	Prada	Abejar	Artoles			Morella	Collado	Moutonianum	Papo Seco
125	Barremian		Vega de Pas	Rúbies	Tera Gp. - Golmayo	Alacón/Blesa	Blesa	Camarillas	Mirambel	Collado	Moutonianum	Papo Seco
150	Hauterivian		Vega de Pas	Rúbies	Ur Gp. - Pinilla	Llacova	Blesa	Castellar	Tera Gp. - Pinilla	Villares		Porto da Calada
150	Hauterivian		Vega de Pas	Rúbies	Ur Gp. - Pinilla	Llacova	hiatus	Castellar		Villares		Porto da Calada
150	Hauterivian		Vega de Pas	Rúbies	Ur Gp. - Pinilla	Huerva	hiatus	Castellar	Gaita			Porto da Calada
150	Valanginian		Villaro	Rúbies	Ur Gp. - Larriba	Huerva	hiatus	Castellar	Ped Gp. - Hortigüela			Porto da Calada
150	Valanginian		Villaro	Rúbies	Ped Gp. - Hortigüela	Huerva	hiatus	Castellar	Ped Gp. - Piedrahita			Porto da Calada
150	Valanginian		Villaro	Rúbies	Peñacoba	Huerva	hiatus	Galve	Ped Gp. - Piedrahita	Miravetes		Porto da Calada
150	Berriasian		Cab Gp. - Arcera	Rúbies	Valdeprado	hiatus	hiatus	Alfambra	Ped Gp. - Piedrahita	Miravetes		Porto da Calada
150	Berriasian		Cab Gp. - Arcera		TdL Gp. - Rupelo	hiatus	hiatus	Arzobispo	hiatus	Tollo		Porto da Calada
150	Berriasian		Cab Gp. - Arcera		On Gp. - Huérteles; Sierra Matute	hiatus	hiatus	Arzobispo	hiatus	Tollo		Porto da Calada
150	Tithonian		Lastres		Tera Gp. - Magaña	hiatus	Higuereles		hiatus	Tera Gp. - Magaña		Lourinhã
150	Tithonian		Lastres		Tera Gp. - Magaña	hiatus	Higuereles		Arzobispo	Tera Gp. - Magaña		Lourinhã
150	Tithonian		Lastres		Ágreda	hiatus	Higuereles		Arzobispo	Tera Gp. - Magaña		Lourinhã
Legend		Major fossiliferous, oofossiliferous, ichnofossiliferous, coproliferous, minor formation										

== See also ==
- List of dinosaur-bearing rock formations
  - List of stratigraphic units with few dinosaur genera
- Tremp Formation
- Baltic, Burmese, Dominican, Mexican amber
