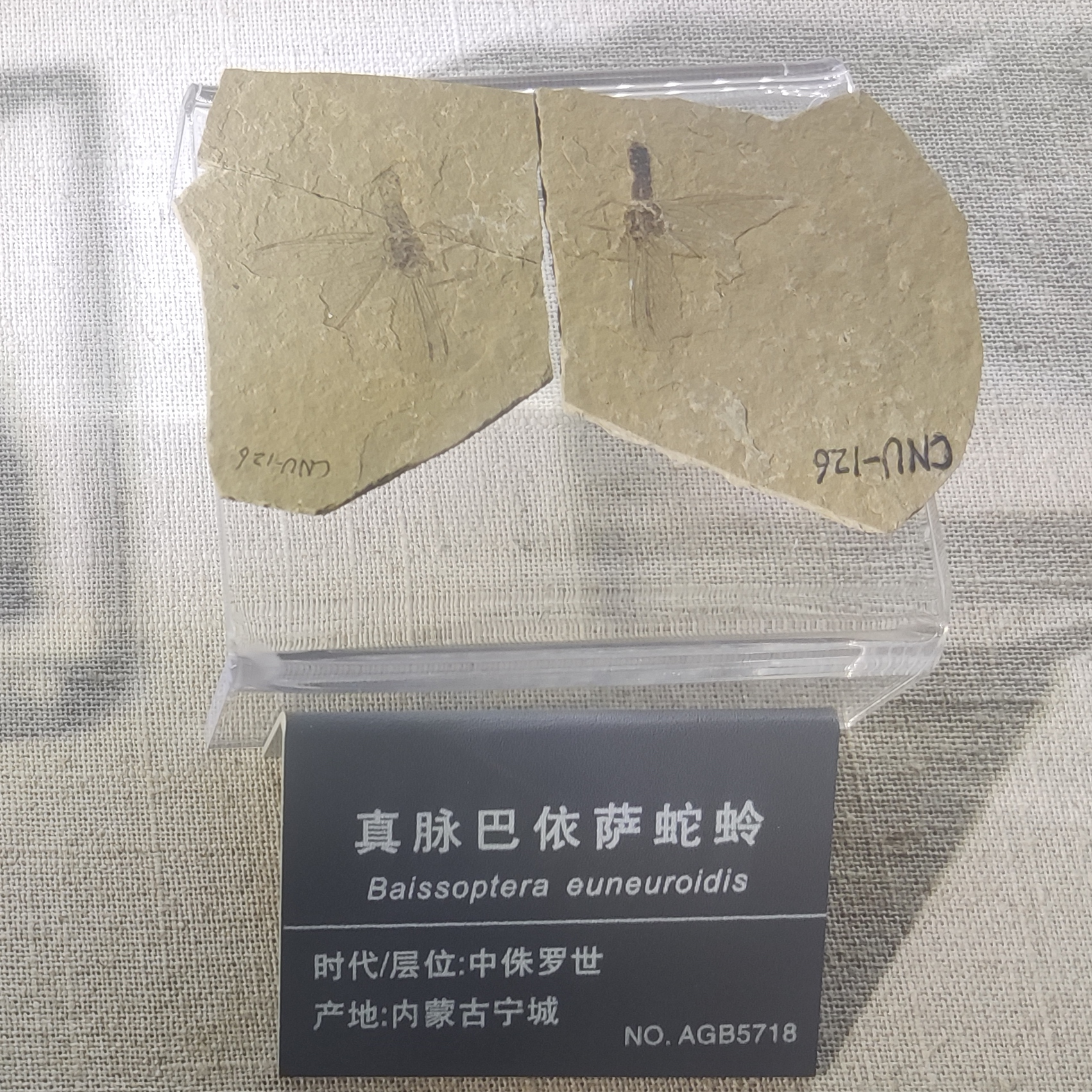

Scientific classification
- Kingdom: Animalia
- Phylum: Arthropoda
- Class: Insecta
- Order: Raphidioptera
- Family: †Baissopteridae
- Genus: †Baissoptera; Martynova, 1961

= Baissoptera =

Extinct genus of insects

Baissoptera is an extinct genus of snakefly in the Baissopteridae family which was described by Martynova in 1961. Since 1961, it has been described three times; Carpenter in 1992, Ponomarenko in 1988 and Engel in 2002. According to J. Jepson et al. in 2011, the parent taxon is Baissopteridae. Fossils of the species have been found in Brazil, China, Spain and Russia.

== Species ==
Baissoptera includes 14 species:

- †Baissoptera bicolor Lyu, Ren & Liu, 2017
- †Baissoptera brasiliensis Oswald, 1990
- †Baissoptera cellulosa Ponomarenko, 1993
- †Baissoptera cretaceoelectra Pérez-de la Fuente et al., 2012
- †Baissoptera elongata Ponomarenko, 1993
- †Baissoptera euneura Ren, 1997
- †Baissoptera grandis Ren, 1995
- †Baissoptera liaoningensis Ren, 1994
- †Baissoptera lisae Jepson et al., 2011
- †Baissoptera martinsoni Martynova, 1961
- †Baissoptera minima Ponomarenko, 1993
- †Baissoptera pulchra Martins-Neto & Nel, 1992
- †Baissoptera sibirica Ponomarenko, 1993
- †Baissoptera sinica Lyu, Ren & Liu, 2017
