= Journal of the Kansas Entomological Society =

- Discipline: Entomology
- Language: English
- Edited by: Roy Beckemeyer

Publication details
- History: 1928–present
- Publisher: Kansas Entomological Society (United States)
- Frequency: Quarterly
- Impact factor: 0.607 (2009)

Standard abbreviations
- ISO 4: J. Kans. Entomol. Soc.

Indexing
- CODEN: JKESA7
- ISSN: 0022-8567 (print); 1937-2353 (web)
- LCCN: 68001331
- JSTOR: 00228567
- OCLC no.: 1783294

Links
- Journal homepage

The Journal of the Kansas Entomological Society is a quarterly peer-reviewed scientific journal published by the Kansas Entomological Society. The journal has a 2009 impact factor of 0.607.
