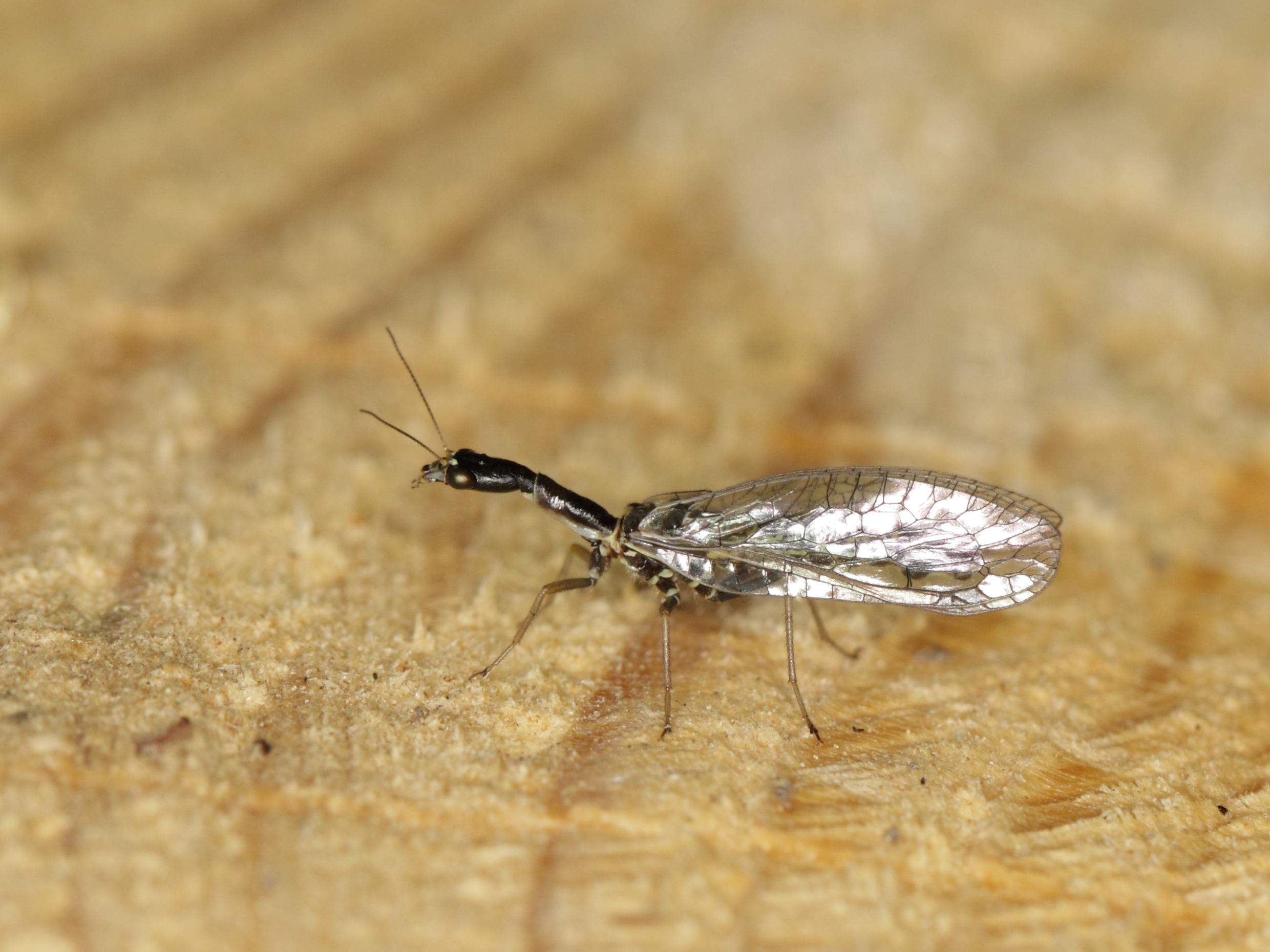
- Raphidia ophiopsis

Scientific classification
- Domain: Eukaryota
- Kingdom: Animalia
- Phylum: Arthropoda
- Class: Insecta
- Order: Raphidioptera
- Family: Raphidiidae
- Genus: Raphidia; Linnaeus, 1758

Species
- see text

= Raphidia =

Raphidia Temporal range: 47.8–0 Ma

Genus of insects

Raphidia is a genus of snakefly, mainly found in Europe.

== Species ==
The following are included in BioLib.cz:

subgenus Aserbeidshanoraphidia Aspöck & Aspöck, 1968

- Raphidia nuchensis H. Aspöck et al., 1968

subgenus Nigroraphidia Aspöck & Aspöck, 1968

1. Raphidia friederikae H. Aspöck & U. Aspöck, 1967
2. Raphidia palaeformis H. Aspöck & U. Aspöck, 1964

subgenus Raphidia Linnaeus, 1758

1. Raphidia alcoholica H. Aspöck & U. Aspöck, 1970
2. Raphidia ambigua H. Aspöck & U. Aspöck, 1964
3. Raphidia ariadne H. Aspöck & U. Aspöck, 1964
4. Raphidia beieri H. Aspöck & U. Aspöck, 1964
5. Raphidia euxina Navás, 1915
6. Raphidia grusinica H. Aspöck et al., 1968
7. Raphidia huettingeri H. Aspöck & U. Aspöck, 1970
8. Raphidia kimminsi H. Aspöck & U. Aspöck, 1964
9. Raphidia ligurica (Albarda, 1891)
10. Raphidia mysia H. Aspöck et al., 1991
11. Raphidia ophiopsis Linnaeus, 1758
12. Raphidia peterressli H. Aspöck & U. Aspöck, 1973
13. Raphidia ulrikae H. Aspöck, 1964

subgenus not placed

1. Raphidia armeniaca Hagen, 1867
2. Raphidia bavarica Hagen, 1867
3. Raphidia communis Retzius, 1783
4. Raphidia duomilia Yang, 1998
5. Raphidia immaculata Donovan, 1800
6. Raphidia mongolica Navás, 1915
7. Raphidia taurica Hagen, 1867
