= Pterostigma =

Specialized group of cells in outer wings of certain insects

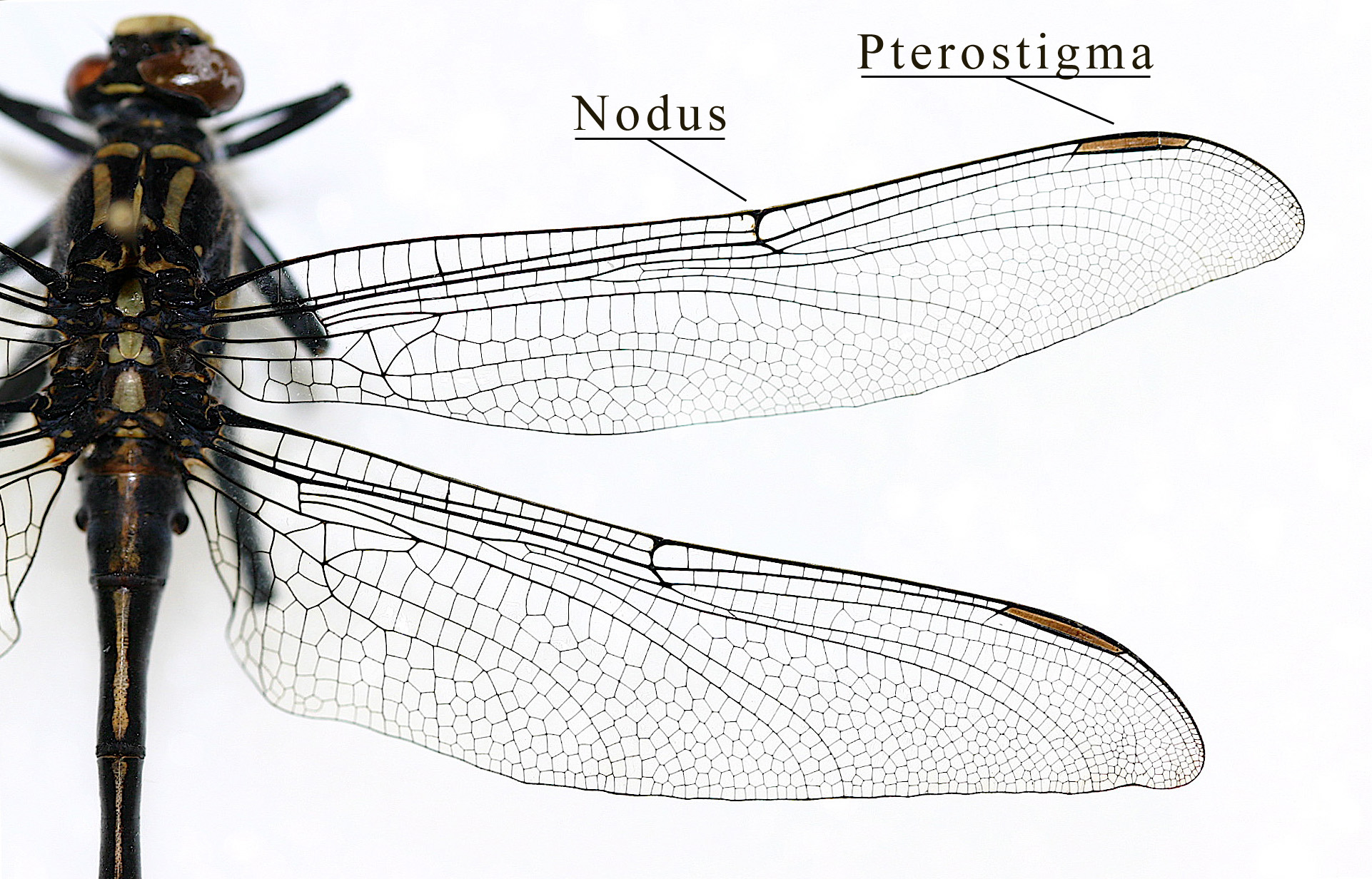
Wing of a dragonfly, showing the pterostigma

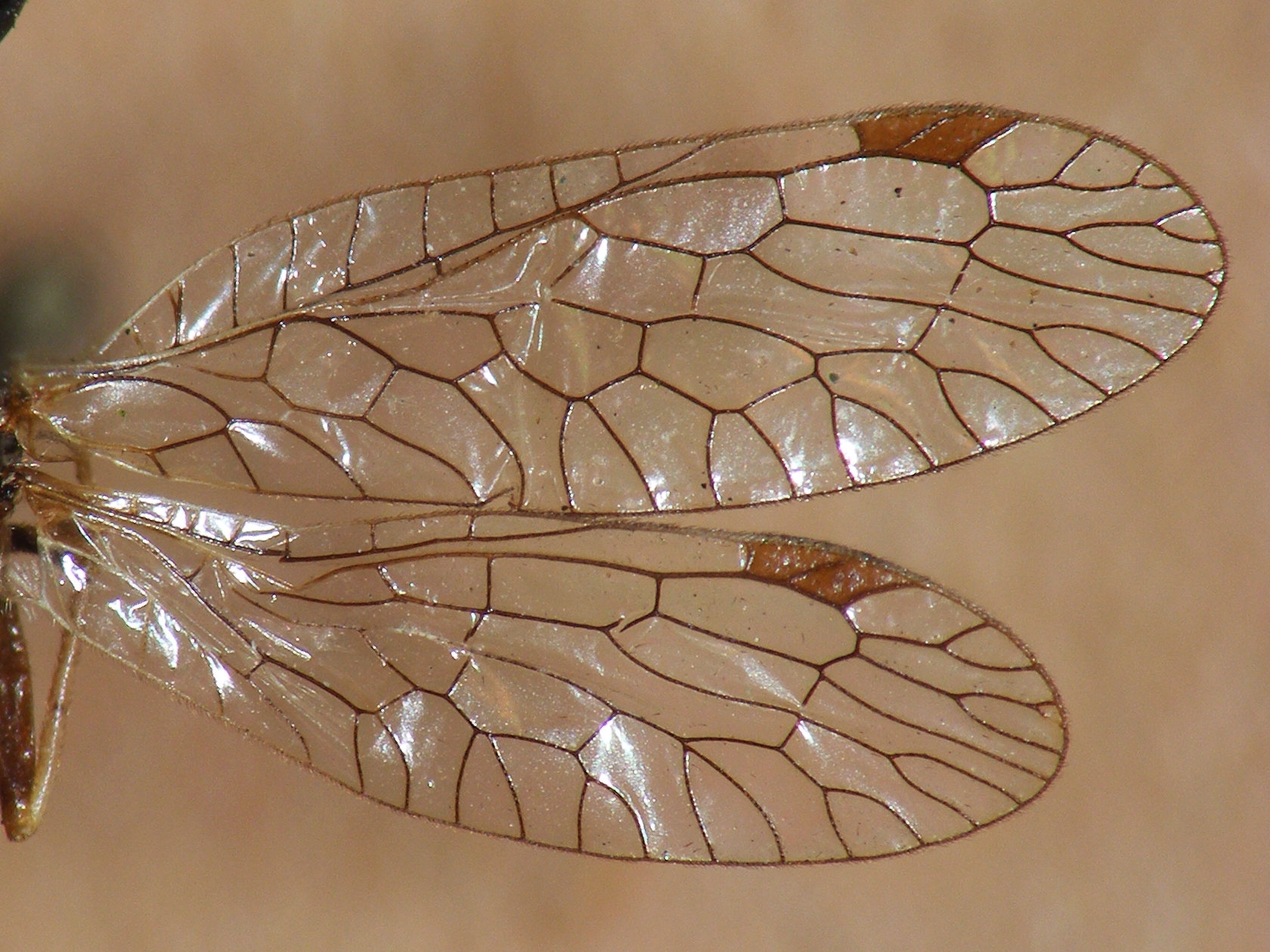
Wings of a snakefly

The pterostigma (plural: pterostigmata) is a group of specialized cells in the outer wings of insects, which are often thickened or coloured, and thus stand out from other cells. It is particularly noticeable in dragonflies, but present also in other insect groups, such as snakeflies, hymenopterans, and megalopterans. It is also often referred to as a stigma.

== Purpose ==
The pterostigma, a heavier section of the wing than nearby sections, assists in gliding. Without the pterostigmata, self-exciting vibrations known as flutter would set in on the wing above a certain critical speed, making gliding impossible. Tests show that with the pterostigmata, the critical gliding speed is increased 10–25% on one species of dragonfly.

== Pseudopterostigma ==
Some female damselflies in the family Calopterygidae possess a pseudopterostigma. This is similar in location on the wing to a true pterostigma but is crossed by veins and is only defined by its paler colour compared to surrounding areas of the wing.
