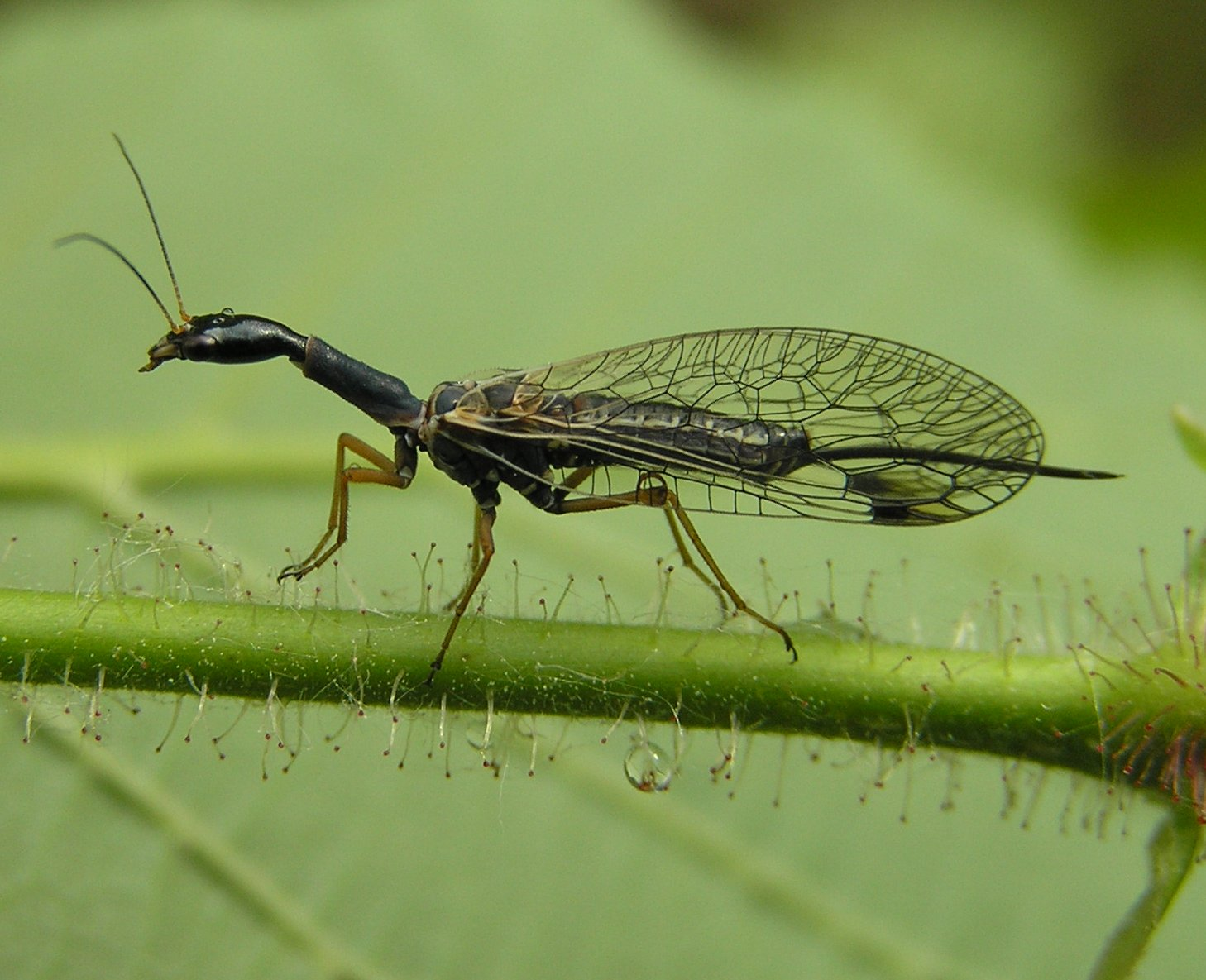
- Female Dichrostigma flavipes

Scientific classification
- Kingdom: Animalia
- Phylum: Arthropoda
- Clade: Pancrustacea
- Class: Insecta
- Clade: Neuropterida
- Order: Raphidioptera; Handlirsch, 1908

Suborders
- Raphidiomorpha †Priscaenigmatomorpha

Synonyms
- Raphidiodea

= Snakefly =

Snakefly Temporal range: Lower Jurassic–Recent

Order of insects

Snakeflies are a group of predatory insects comprising the order Raphidioptera, from Ancient Greek ῥαφίς (rhaphís), meaning "needle", and πτερόν (pterón), meaning "wing", with two extant families: Raphidiidae and Inocelliidae, consisting of roughly 260 species. In the past, the group had a much wider distribution than it does now; snakeflies are found in temperate regions worldwide but are absent from the tropics and the Southern Hemisphere. Recognizable representatives of the group first appeared during the Early Jurassic. They are a relict group, having reached their apex of diversity during the Cretaceous before undergoing substantial decline.

An adult snakefly resembles a lacewing in appearance but has a notably elongated thorax which, together with the mobile head, gives the group their common name. The body is long and slender and the two pairs of long, membranous wings are prominently veined. Females have a large and sturdy ovipositor which is used to deposit eggs in some concealed location. They are holometabolous insects with a four-stage life cycle consisting of eggs, larvae, pupae and adults. In most species, the larvae develop under the bark of trees. They may take several years before they undergo metamorphosis, requiring a period of chilling before pupation takes place. Both adults and larvae are predators of soft-bodied arthropods.

== Description ==
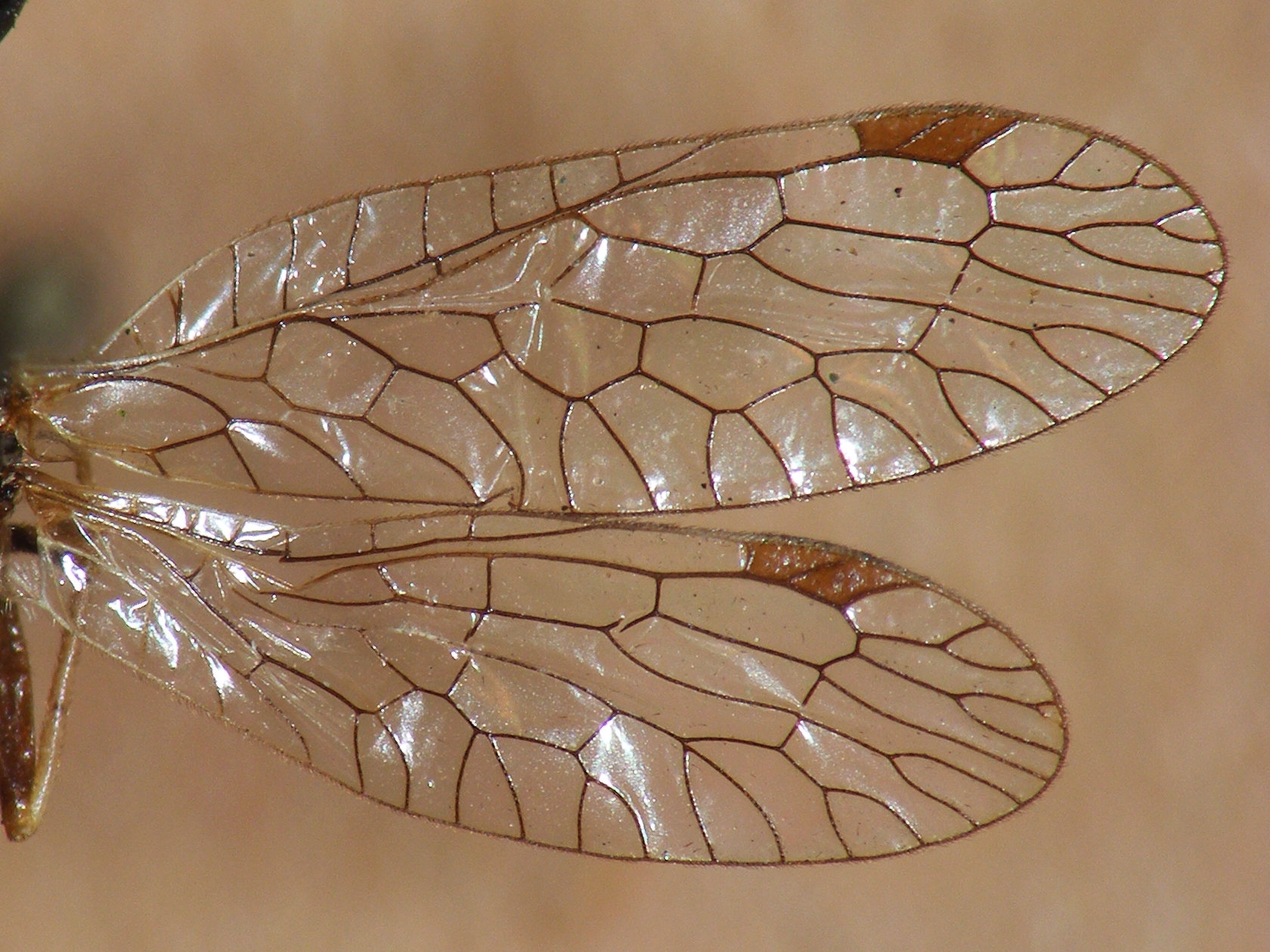
Wings of Raphidia ophiopsis showing coloured pterostigmata

Adult snakeflies are easily distinguished from similar insects by having an elongated prothorax but not the modified forelegs of the mantis-flies. Most species are between 15 and 30 mm (0.6 and 1.2 in) in length. The head is long and flattened, and heavily sclerotised; it may be broad or taper at the back, but is very mobile. The mouthparts are strong and relatively unspecialised, being modified for biting. The large compound eyes are at the sides of the head. Members of the family Inocelliidae have no ocelli; while members of the Raphidiidae have three distinct ocelli, but are mostly differentiated by elimination, lacking the traits found in inocelliids. The prothorax is notably elongated and mobile, giving the group its common name of snakefly. The three pairs of legs are similar in size and appearance. The two pair of dragonfly-like wings are similar in size, with a primitive venation pattern, a thickened leading edge, and a coloured wingspot, the pterostigma. Inocelliids lack a cross vein in the pterostigma that is present in raphidiids. The females in both families typically have a long ovipositor, which they use to deposit their eggs into crevices or under bark.

== Distribution and habitat ==
Snakeflies are usually found in temperate coniferous forest. They are distributed widely around the globe, the majority of species occurring in Europe and Asia, but also being found in certain regions of Africa, western North America and Central America. In Africa, just 5 species, Harraphidia divergens, Harraphidia harpyia, Mauroraphidia maghrebina, Africoraphidia spilonota, and Fibla peyerimhoffi, are only found in the mountains north of the Sahara Desert in Morocco, Algeria, Tunisia, and possibly Libya.

In North America, they are found west of the Rocky Mountains, and range from southwest Canada all the way to the Mexican-Guatemalan Border, which is the furthest south they have been found in the western hemisphere. In the eastern hemisphere, they can be found from Spain to Japan. Many species are found throughout Europe and Asia with the southern edge of their range in northern Thailand and northern India. Snakeflies have a relict distribution, having had a more widespread range and being more diverse in the past; there are more species in Central Asia than anywhere else. In the southern parts of their range, they are largely restricted to higher altitudes, up to around 3,000 m (10,000 ft). Even though this insect order is widely distributed, the range of individual species is often very limited and some species are confined to a single mountain range.

== Life cycle ==
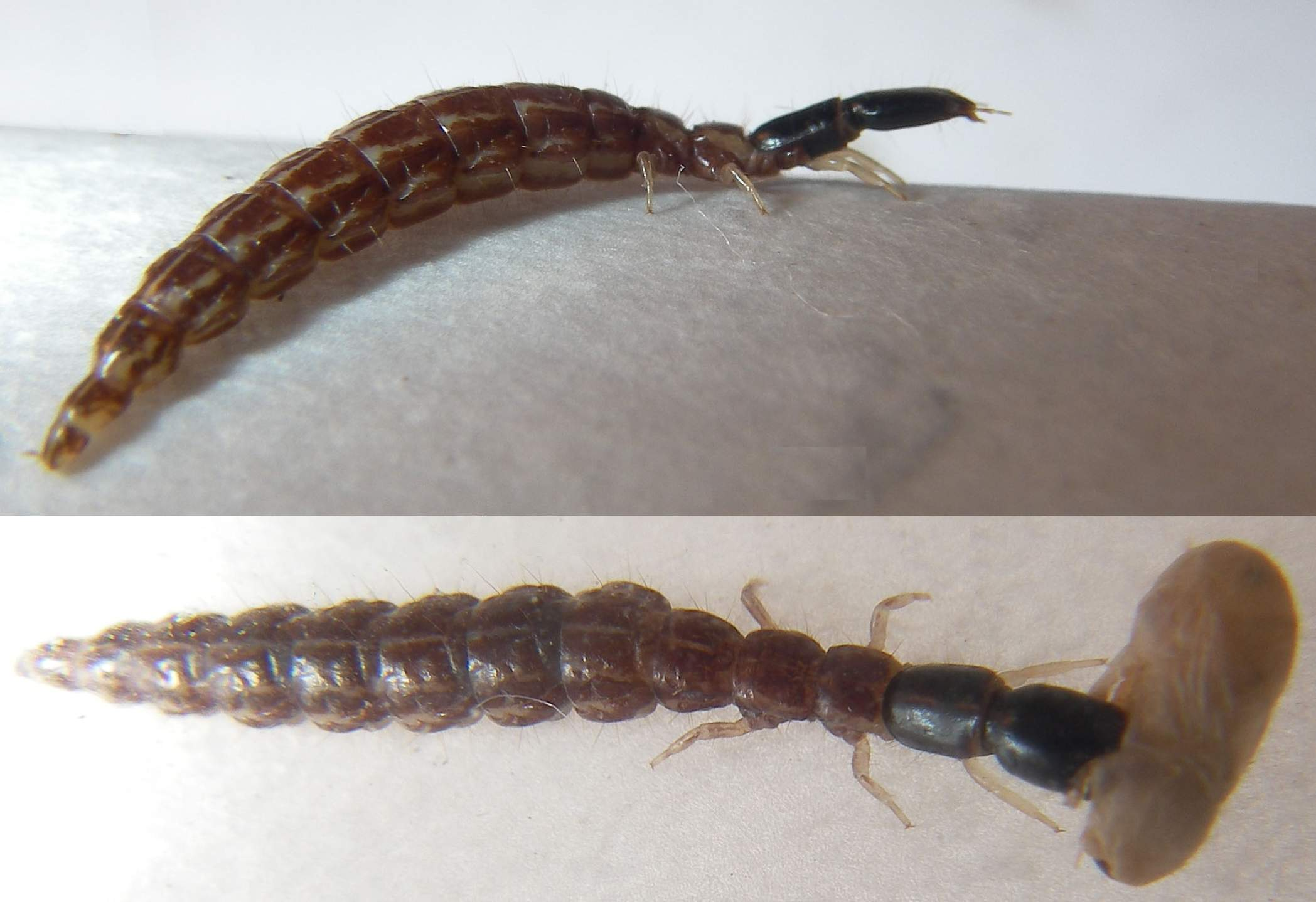
Larva

Snakeflies are holometabolous insects, having a four-stage life cycle with eggs, larvae, pupae and adults. Before mating, the adults engage in an elaborate courtship ritual, including a grooming behaviour involving legs and antennae. In raphidiids, mating takes place in a "dragging position", while in inocelliids, the male adopts a tandem position under the female; copulation may last for up to three hours in some inoceliid species. The eggs are oviposited into suitable locations and hatch in from a few days to about three weeks.

The larvae have large heads with projecting mandibles. The head and the first segment of the thorax are sclerotised, but the rest of the body is soft and fleshy. They have three pairs of true legs, but no prolegs. However, they do possess an adhesive organ on the abdomen, which they can use to fasten themselves to vertical surfaces.

There is no set number of instars the larvae will go through, some species can have as many as ten or eleven. The larval stage usually lasts for two to three years, but in some species can extend for six years. The final larval instar, the prepupal stage, creates a cell in which the insect pupates. The pupa is able to bite when disturbed, and shortly before the adult emerges, it gains the ability to walk and often leaves its cell for another location. All snakeflies require a period of cool temperatures (probably around 0 °C (32 °F)) to induce pupation. The length of the pupation stage is variable. Most species pupate in the spring or early summer, and take a few days to three weeks before ecdysis. If the larvae begin pupation in the late summer or early fall, they can take up to ten months before the adults emerge. Insects reared at constant temperatures in a laboratory may become "prothetelous", developing the compound eyes and wingpads of pupae, but living for years without completing metamorphosis.

== Ecology ==
Adult snakeflies are territorial and carnivorous organisms. They are diurnal and are important predators of aphids and mites. Pollen has also been found in the guts of these organisms and it is unclear whether they require pollen for part of their lifecycle or if it is a favoured food source. The larvae of many raphidiids live immediately below the bark of trees, although others live around the tree bole, in crevices in rocks, among leaf litter and in detritus. Here they feed on the eggs and larvae of other arthropods such as mites, springtails, spiders, barklice, sternorrhynchids and auchenorrhynchids. The actual diets of the larvae vary according to their habitats, but both larvae and adults are efficient predators.

Predators of snakeflies include birds; in Europe, these are woodland species such as the treecreeper, great spotted woodpecker, wood warbler, nuthatch, and dunnock, as well as generalist insect-eating species such as the collared flycatcher. Typically 5-15% of snakefly larvae are parasitized, mainly by parasitoid wasps, but rates as high as 50% have been observed in some species.

== Evolution ==
During the Mesozoic era (252 to 66 mya), there was a large and diverse fauna of Raphidioptera as exemplified by the abundant fossils that have been found in all parts of the world. This came to an abrupt end at the end of the Cretaceous period, likely as a result of the Cretaceous–Paleogene extinction event (66 mya) when an enormous asteroid is thought to have hit the Earth. This seems to have extinguished all but the most cold-tolerant species of snakefly, resulting in the extinction of the majority of families, including all the tropical and sub-tropical species. The two families of present-day Raphidioptera are thus relict populations of this previously widespread group. They have been considered living fossils, because modern-day species closely resemble species from the early Jurassic period (140 mya). There are about 260 extant species.

=== Fossil history ===
Several extinct families are known only from fossils dating from the Lower Jurassic to the Miocene, the great majority of them belonging to the suborder Raphidiomorpha. The transitional Middle Jurassic Juroraphidiidae form a clade with the Raphidiomorpha.

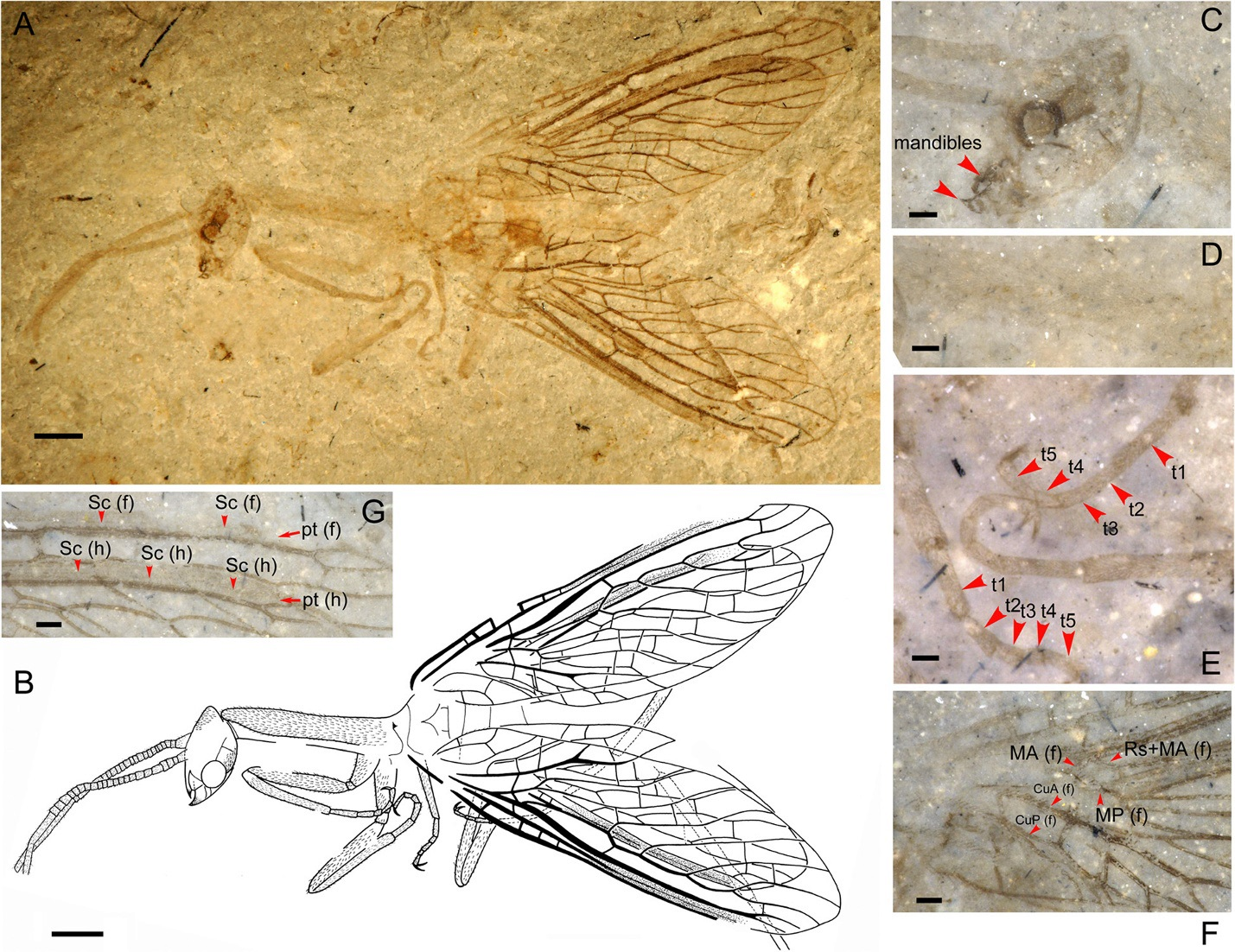
Juroraphidia longicollum (†Juroraphidiidae) transitional fossil of Middle Jurassic age, from China

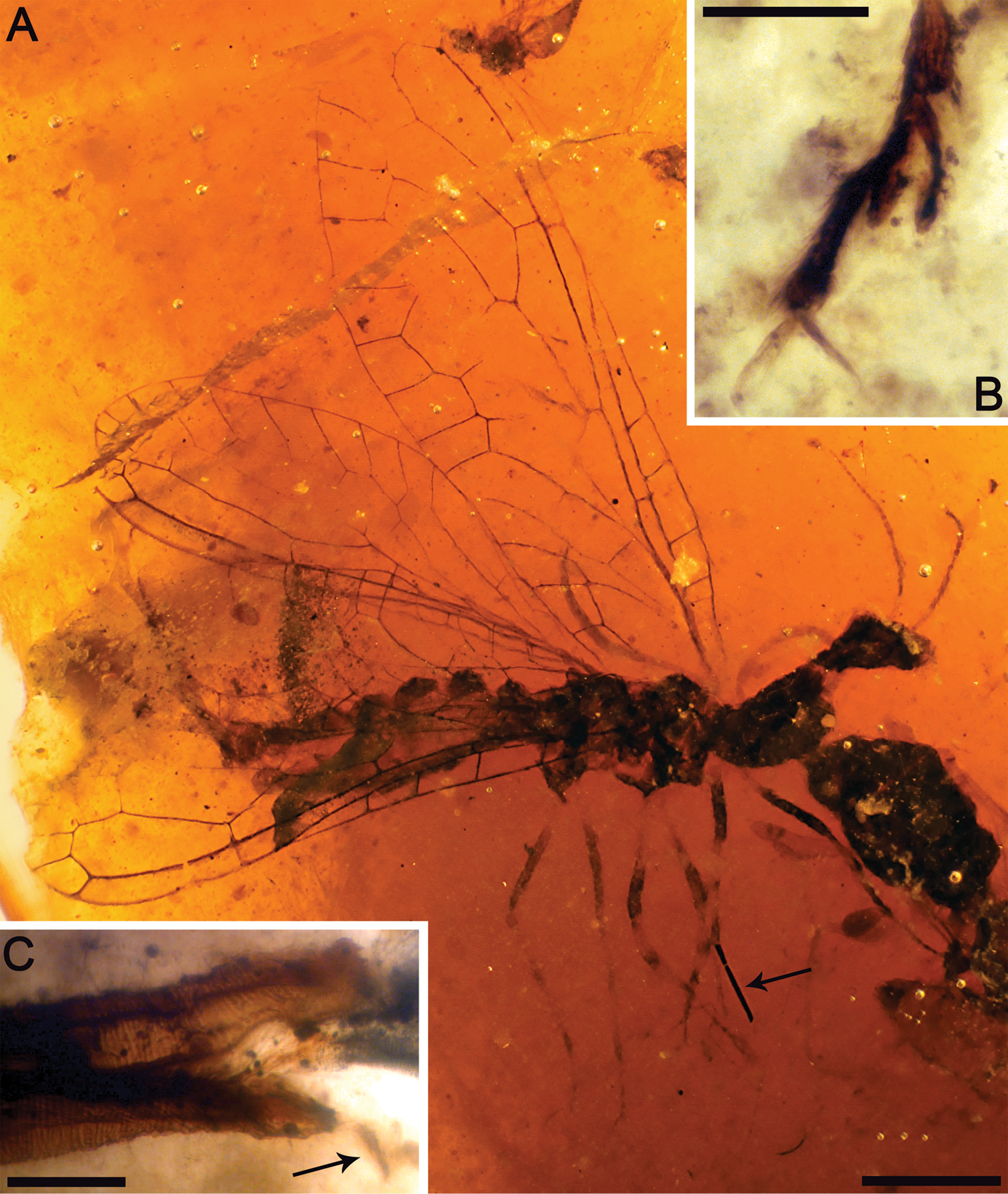
Amarantoraphidia (†Mesoraphidiidae) in Early Cretaceous amber, Spain

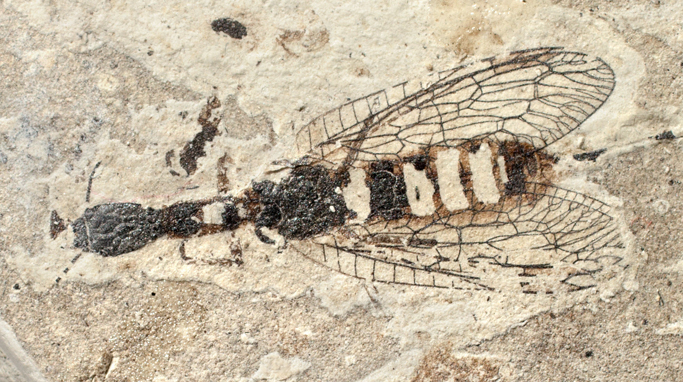
Ohmella coffini (Raphidiidae) from the Miocene of France

=== Phylogeny ===
Molecular analysis using mitochondrial RNA and the mitogenome has clarified the group's phylogeny within the Neuropterida, as shown in the cladogram.

- Neuropterida
  - Raphidioptera (snakeflies)
  - - Megaloptera (alderflies and allies)
    - Neuroptera
      - Osmylidae (giant lacewings)
      - - Hemerobiiformia (lacewings)
        - Myrmeleontiformia (antlions and allies)

The name Raphidioptera comes from Ancient Greek ῥαφίς (rhaphís), meaning "needle, and πτερόν (pterón), meaning "wing".

The Megaloptera, Neuroptera (in the modern sense) and Raphidioptera are very closely related, forming the group Neuropterida. This is either placed at superorder rank, with the Holometabola – of which they are part – becoming an unranked clade above it, or the Holometabola are maintained as a superorder, with an unranked Neuropterida being a part of them. Within the holometabolans, the closest living relatives of Neuropterida are the beetles.

Two suborders of Raphidioptera and their families are grouped below according to Engel (2002) with updates according to Bechly and Wolf-Schwenninger (2011) and Ricardo Pérez-de la Fuente et al. (2012). For lists of genera, see the articles on the individual families.

Raphidioptera

- †Priscaenigmatomorpha Engel, 2002
  - ?Genus Chrysoraphidia Liu et al., 2013 - Yixian Formation, China Early Cretaceous (Aptian) (some authors have suggested closer affinities to Neuroptera)
  - Family †Priscaenigmatidae Engel, 2002 - (Early Jurassic-Early Cretaceous)
    - Genus †Hondelagia Bode, 1953 - Green Series, Germany, Early Jurassic (Toarcian)
    - Genus †Priscaenigma Whalley, 1985 - Charmouth Mudstone Formation, United Kingdom, Early Jurassic (Sinemurian)
    - Genus †Sukachevia Khramov, 2020 - Karabastau Formation, Kazakhstan, Late Jurassic
    - Genus †Cretohondelagia Khramov, 2020 - Khasturty locality, Russia, Early Cretaceous (Aptian)
  - Family †Juroraphidiidae Liu, Ren, & Yang, 2014
    - Genus †Juroraphidia Liu, Ren, & Yang, 2014 - Jiulongshan Formation, China, Middle Jurassic
- Raphidiomorpha Engel, 2002
  - Family †Metaraphidiidae Bechly & Wolf-Schwenninger, 2011 - (Early Jurassic)
    - Genus †Metaraphidia Whalley, 1985 - Charmouth Mudstone Formation, United Kingdom, Early Jurassic (Sinemurian) Posidonia Shale, Early Jurassic (Toarcian)
  - Family †Baissopteridae Martynova, 1961 - (Cretaceous-Eocene)
    - Genus †Allobaissoptera Lu, Zhang, Wang, Engel, & Liu, 2020 - Burmese amber, Mid Cretaceous (Albian-Cenomanian)
    - Genus †Ascalapharia Novokshonov, 1990 - Kzyl-Zhar, Kazakhstan, Late Cretaceous (Turonian)
    - Genus †Austroraphidia Willmann, 1994 - Crato Formation, Brazil, Early Cretaceous (Aptian)
    - Genus †Baissoptera Martynova, 1961 - Crato Formation, Brazil, Yixian Formation, China, Zaza Formation, Russia Early Cretaceous (Aptian), Spanish amber, Early Cretaceous (Albian) Burmese amber
    - Genus †Burmobiassoptera Lu, Zhang, Wang, Engel, & Liu, 2020 - Burmese amber, Mid Cretaceous (Albian-Cenomanian)
    - Genus †Cretoraphidia Ponomarenko, 1993 - Zaza Formation, Russia Early Cretaceous (Aptian)
    - Genus †Cretoraphidiopsis Engel, 2002 - Dzun-Bain Formation, Mongolia, Early Cretaceous (Aptian)
    - Genus †Dictyoraphidia Handlirsch, 1910 - Florissant Formation, Colorado, United States, Eocene (Priabonian)
    - Genus †Electrobaissoptera Lu, Zhang, Wang, Engel, & Liu, 2020 - Burmese amber, Mid Cretaceous (Albian-Cenomanian)
    - Genus †Lugala Willmann, 1994 - Dzun-Bain Formation, Mongolia, Early Cretaceous (Aptian)
    - Genus †Microbaissoptera Lyu et al., 2017 - Yixian Formation, China, Early Cretaceous (Aptian)
    - Genus †Rhynchobaissoptera Lu, Zhang, Wang, Engel, & Liu, 2020 - Burmese amber, Mid Cretaceous (Albian-Cenomanian)
    - Genus †Stenobaissoptera Lu, Zhang, Wang, Engel, & Liu, 2020 - Burmese amber, Mid Cretaceous (Albian-Cenomanian)
  - Family †Mesoraphidiidae Martynov, 1925 (Paraphyletic) (30+ genera) - (Middle Jurassic-Late Cretaceous)
  - Neoraphidioptera Engel, 2007- (Paleogene-Recent)
    - Family Inocelliidae Navás
      - Subfamily †Electrinocelliinae Engel, 1995
      - Subfamily Inocelliinae Navás
    - Family Raphidiidae Latreille, 1810
- Incertae sedis
  - Genus †Arariperaphidia Martins-Neto & Vulcano, 1989 - (Lower Cretaceous; Brazil)

== Possible biological pest control agents ==
Snakeflies have been considered a viable option for biological control of agricultural pests. The main advantage is that they have few predators, and both adults and larvae are predacious. A disadvantage is that snakeflies have a long larval period, so their numbers increase only slowly, and it could take a long time to rid crops of pests; another issue is that they prey on a limited range of pest species. An unidentified North American species was introduced into Australia and New Zealand in the early twentieth century for this purpose, but failed to become established.
