= 2011 in arthropod paleontology =

This list of fossil arthropods described in 2011 is a list of new taxa of trilobites, fossil insects, crustaceans, arachnids and other fossil arthropods of every kind that have been described during the year 2011. The list only includes taxa at the level of genus or species.

== Arachnids ==
Name	Novelty	Status	Authors	Age	Unit	Location	Notes	Images
Acarus indicus	Sp. nov	Disputed	Kumar et al.	Early Permian	Manjir Formation	India	A mite. Originally described as a species of Acarus; Sidorchuk (2018) considered it more likely to be a misidentified immature nothrine oribatid mite (probably a member of the family Nothridae), and more likely to be a contaminant from the extant soil fauna rather than a genuine Paleozoic fossil.	
Ameticos	Gen. et sp. nov		Garwood et al.	Carboniferous (late Stephanian)		France	A member of Opiliones. The type species is A. scolos.	
Araneaovoius columbiae	Gen et comb nov	valid	Dunlop & Braddy	?Ypresian	Quesnel ?Fraser Formation	Canada; British Columbia	An orb-web spider egg sack ichnogenus. New ichnogenus for Aranea columbiae (Scudder 1878).	Araneaovoius columbiae (1890 illustration
Burmesiola	Gen. et sp. nov	Valid	Wunderlich	Late Cretaceous (Cenomanian)	Burmese amber	Myanmar	A tree trunk spider. Genus includes new species B. cretacea.	
Chaerilobuthus	Gen. et sp. nov	Valid	Lourenço & Beigel	Late Cretaceous (Cenomanian)	Burmese amber	Myanmar	A chaerilobuthid scorpion. The type species is C. complexus.	
Eoscaphiella	Gen. et sp. nov	Valid	Wunderlich	Late Cretaceous (Cenomanian)	Burmese amber	Myanmar	A member of the family Tetrablemmidae. Genus includes new species E. ohlhoffi.	
Episinus tibiaseta	Sp. nov	Valid	Wunderlich	Miocene	Dominican amber	Dominican Republic	A member of the family Theridiidae, a species of Episinus.	
Femurraptor	Gen. et sp. nov	Valid	Wunderlich	Miocene	Dominican amber	Dominican Republic	A member of the family Theridiidae. Genus includes new species F. dominicanus.	
Fictotama maculosa	Sp. nov	Valid	Wunderlich	Miocene	Dominican amber	Dominican Republic	A tree trunk spider.	
Glaesacarus	Gen. et comb. nov	Valid	Sidorchuk & Klimov	Eocene	Baltic amber	Europe (Baltic Sea region)	A mite; a new genus for "Acarus" rhombeus Koch & Berendt (1854)	
Jerseyuloborus	Gen. et sp. nov	Valid	Wunderlich	Late Cretaceous	New Jersey amber	United States	A member of the family Uloboridae. Genus includes new species J. longisoma.	
Macrogyion	Gen. et sp. nov		Garwood et al.	Carboniferous (late Stephanian)		France	A member of Opiliones. The type species is M. cronus.	
Nephila jurassica	sp nov	Objective synonym	Selden, Shih & Ren	Middle Jurassic	Jiulongshan Formation	China	largest fossil spider described. objective syn of Mongolarachne jurassica	Mongolarachne jurassic
Labidostomma paleoluteum	Sp. nov	Valid	Dunlop & Bertrand	Eocene	Baltic amber	Europe (Baltic Sea region)	A mite, a species of Labidostomma.	
Praeterleptoneta tibialis	Sp. nov	Valid	Wunderlich	Late Cretaceous (Cenomanian)	Burmese amber	Myanmar	A member of Araneomorphae belonging to the family Praeterleptonetidae. Originally described as a species of Praeterleptoneta, subsequently transferred to the separate genus Parvispina.	
Scopoides dominicanus	Sp. nov	Valid	Wunderlich	Miocene	Dominican amber	Dominican Republic	A ground spider, a species of Scopoides.	
Siro balticus	Sp. nov	Valid	Dunlop & Mitov	Eocene	Baltic amber	Europe (Baltic Sea region)	A member of Opiliones, a species of Siro.	
Spinocharinus	Gen. et sp. nov	Valid	Poschmann & Dunlop	Early Devonian		Germany	A member of Trigonotarbida. The type species is S. steinmeyeri.	

== Crustaceans ==
Name	Novelty	Status	Authors	Age	Unit	Location	Notes	Images
Aenigmastacus	Gen et sp nov	valid	Feldmann, Schweitzer, & Leahy	Eocene; Ypresian	Okanagan Highlands; Tranquille Formation	Canada; British Columbia	A parastacid freshwater crayfish	
Dynamenella miettoi	Sp. nov	Valid	De Angeli & Lovato	Eocene; Lutetian		Italy	An isopod belonging to the family Sphaeromatidae.	

== Insects ==
Name	Novelty	Status	Authors	Age	Unit	Location	Notes	Images
Agulla protomaculata	sp nov	jr synonym	Engel	Lutetian	Green River Formation	USA	A raphidiid snakefly. Moved to Archiinocellia protomaculata in 2021	Archiinocellia protomaculata
Alicodoxa	Gen et sp nov	Valid	Emeljanov & Shcherbakov	late Eocene	Rovno amber	Ukraine	A planthopper, type species A. rasnitsyni also found in Baltic amber	Alicodoxa rasnitsyni
Anonychomyrma geinitzi	Comb nov	valid	(Mayr)	Lutetian	Baltic amber	Europe	Fossil Dolichoderin ant	Anonychomyrma geinitzi
Aradus andancensis	Sp nov	valid	Marchal, Guilbert, Brisac, & Nel	Turolian	Montagne d'Andance	France	A flat bug	Aradus andancensis
Archiaustroconops borkenti	Sp. nov	Valid	Pérez-de la Fuente et al.	Early Cretaceous (Albian)	El Soplao amber deposit	Spain	A fly belonging to the family Ceratopogonidae.	
Arostropsis	Gen et sp nov	valid	Yunakov & Kirejtshuk	Eocene	Baltic amber	Europe	Monotypic broad-nosed weevil genus, one species A. groehni	Arostropsis groehni
Astreptolabis	Subfam, Gen et sp nov	valid	Engel	Albian	Burmese amber	Myanmar	Monotypic earwig subfamily, one species A. ethirosomatia	Astreptolabis ethirosomatia
Atriculicoides szadziewskii	Sp. nov	Valid	Pérez-de la Fuente et al.	Early Cretaceous (Albian)	El Soplao amber deposit	Spain	A fly belonging to the family Ceratopogonidae.	
Baltimartyria rasnitsyni	sp nov	valid	Mey	Lutetian	Baltic amber	Europe	the second species in Baltimartyria	Baltimartyria rasnitsyni
Baryshnyala	Gen. et sp. nov	Valid	Ilger & Brauckmann	Late Carboniferous (early Bashkirian)	Ziegelschiefer Formation	Germany	A neopteran insect of uncertain systematic placement, assigned to the new family Baryshnyalidae. The type species is B. occulta.	Baryshnyala occulta
Ctenoplectrella phaeton	sp nov	Valid	Gonzalez & Engel	Lutetian	Baltic Amber	Europe	A leaf cutter bee	Ctenoplectrella
Dasyleptus triassicus	Sp. nov	Valid	Bechly & Stockar	Middle Triassic (Ladinian)	Meride Limestone	Switzerland	A member of Archaeognatha, a species of Dasyleptus.	
Deinodryinus velteni	sp nov	Valid	Guglielmino & Olmi	Lutetian	Baltic amber	Europe	A dryinid wasp.	Deinodryinus velteni
Diochus electrus	sp nov	valid	Chatzimanolis & Engel	Lutetian	Baltic amber	Europe	first valid Staphylininae species from the fossil record	Diochus electrus
Dryinus rasnitsyni	sp nov	valid	Olmi & Guglielmino	Burdigalian	Dominican amber	Dominican Republic	second fossil Dryinus lamellatus group species	Dryinus rasnitsyni
Eldermyrmex	Gen et comb nov	Valid	Heterick & Shattuck	Lutetian	Baltic amber	Russia	Fossil Dolichoderine ant, Type species "Iridomyrmex" oblongiceps	Eldermyrmex oblongiceps
Iberoraphidia	sp nov	valid	Jepsen, Ansorge, & Jarzembowski	Lower Barremian	Serra del Montsec	Spain	A mesoraphidiid snakefly, one species Iberoraphidia dividua	
Lebanoculicoides excantabris	Sp. nov	Valid	Pérez-de la Fuente et al.	Early Cretaceous (Albian)	El Soplao amber deposit	Spain	A fly belonging to the family Ceratopogonidae.	
Lebanoraphidia	sp nov	valid	Bechly & Wolf-Schwenninger	Upper Neocomian	Jezzine	Lebanon	A mesoraphidiid snakefly, one species Lebanoraphidia nana	
Leptolingia calonervis	sp.	Valid	Shi, Liu, & Ren	Middle Jurassic	Jiulongshan Formation	China		
Leptolingia imminuta	sp.	Valid	Liu, Shi, & Ren	Middle Jurassic	Daohugou Beds	China	The smallest species known in the family Grammolingiidae	
Litholingia ptesa	sp.	Valid	Shi, Yang, & Ren	Middle Jurassic	Jiulongshan Formation	China		
Mickoleitia longimanus	Ord., fam., gen. et sp.	valid	Staniczek, Bechly, & Godunko	Lower Cretaceous	Crato Formation	Brazil	A new genus in the new family Mickoleitiidae and a new insect order Coxoplectoptera.	Mickoleitia longimanus
Myanmymar	gen et sp nov	valid	Huber	Albian	Burmese amber	Myanmar	oldest mymarid described	Myanmymar aresconoides
Nanotermes	Gen et sp. nov	valid	Engel & Grimaldi	Ypresian	Cambay amber	India	A Termitid termite	Nanotermes isaacae
Ordralfabetix	gen et sp.	valid	Szwedo	Ypresian	Oise amber	France	Second fossil lophopid planthopper from Europe	Ordralfabetix sirophatanis
Parastylotermes krishnai	Sp. nov	valid	Engel & Grimaldi	Ypresian	Cambay amber	India	A Stylotermitid termite	Parastylotermes krishnai
Platyperla marquati	Species	Valid	Gallego et al.	Late Triassic	Potrerillos Formation	Argentina	A platyperlid stonefly, a species of Platyperla.	
Plumalexius	fam, gen et sp.	valid	Brothers	Turonian	New Jersey amber	USA	sister genus to Plumariidae	Plumalexius rasnitsyni
Pristomyrmex rasnitsyni	sp nov	valid	Dlussky & Radchenko	Late Eocene	Scandinavian amber	Denmark	A fossil ant	
Prostylotermes	Gen et sp. nov	valid	Engel & Grimaldi	Ypresian	Cambay amber	India	A Stylotermitid termite	Prostylotermes kamboja
Renphasma	Gen. et sp.	Valid	Nel & Delfosse	Early Cretaceous	Yixian Formation	China	A stick insect	Renphasma sinica
Termitaradus dominicanus	Sp nov	valid	Poinar	Burdigalian?	Dominican amber	Dominican Republic	A termitaphidid termite bug	
Titanomyrma lubei	Gen, sp, et comb nov.	valid	Archibald, Johnson, Mathewes, & Greenwood	Early Eocene	Messel shales	Germany	new genus for the largest known ants	Titanomyrma simillima
Tytthodiplatys	Gen et sp. nov	Valid	Engel	Albian	Burmese amber	Myanmar	Oldest member of the family Diplatyidae	Tytthodiplatys mecynocercus
Undulopsychopsis	Gen et sp. nov	Valid	Peng, Makarkin, Wang, & Ren	Lower Barremian to Upper Aptian	Yixian Formation	China	A psychopsid silky lacewing, only species U. alexi	Undulopsychopsis alexi
Vetuformosa	Sub. Fam., Gen., et Sp. Nov	valid	Poinar	Albian	Burmese amber	Myanmar	A baetid mayfly. The type species is V. buckleyi, type genus of subfamily Vetuformosinae	Vetuformosa buckleyi
Zophotermes	Gen et sp. nov	valid	Engel & Singh	Ypresian	Cambay amber	India	A Rhinotermitid termite	Zophotermes ashoki

== Trilobites ==
Name	Novelty	Status	Authors	Age	Unit	Location	Notes	Images
Chasbellus	Gen. et 2 sp. nov	Valid	Loch & Taylor	Early Ordovician	Bliss Formation; House Limestone; Tanyard Formation; Wilberns Formation	United States	A member of Asaphida belonging to the family Symphysurinidae. The type species is C. milleri; genus also includes C. repetskii.	
Gladiatoria crowei	Sp. nov	Valid	Adrain, McAdams & Westrop	Ordovician (Floian)	Fillmore Limestone; Garden City Formation	United States	A member of the family Bathyuridae.	
Gladiatoria harrisi	Sp. nov	Valid	Adrain, McAdams & Westrop	Ordovician (Floian)	Fillmore Limestone	United States	A member of the family Bathyuridae.	
Gladiatoria nielsenae	Sp. nov	Valid	Adrain, McAdams & Westrop	Ordovician (Floian)	Fillmore Limestone; Garden City Formation	United States	A member of the family Bathyuridae.	
Gladiatoria phoenixi	Sp. nov	Valid	Adrain, McAdams & Westrop	Ordovician (Floian)	Fillmore Limestone; Garden City Formation	United States	A member of the family Bathyuridae.	
Gladiatoria reedi	Sp. nov	Valid	Adrain, McAdams & Westrop	Ordovician (Floian)	Fillmore Limestone; Garden City Formation	United States	A member of the family Bathyuridae.	
Hebediscus williamsi	Sp. nov	Valid	Westrop & Landing	Early Cambrian	Brigus Formation	Canada	A member of the family Hebediscidae.	
Hintzeia parafirmimarginis	Sp. nov	Valid	McAdams & Adrain	Ordovician (Floian)	Fillmore Limestone; Garden City Formation	United States	A member of the family Pliomeridae.	
Luhops coquus	Sp. nov	Valid	Rushton	Cambrian (Drumian)	Abbey Shale	United Kingdom		
Panisaspis	Gen. et 6 sp. et comb. nov	Valid	McAdams & Adrain	Early Ordovician	Fillmore Limestone; Garden City Formation; Yellow Hill Limestone	United States	A member of the family Pliomeridae. The type species is P. millardensis; genus also includes new species P. deltaensis, P. loganensis, P. rancherensis, P. sevierensis and P. topscityensis, as well as "Protopliomerops" quattuor Hintze (1953).	
Protopliomerella bowlesi	Sp. nov	Valid	McAdams & Adrain	Ordovician (Floian)	Fillmore Limestone	United States	A member of the family Pliomeridae.	
Protopliomerella kerouaci	Sp. nov	Valid	McAdams & Adrain	Ordovician (Floian)	Fillmore Limestone; Garden City Formation; Yellow Hill Limestone	United States	A member of the family Pliomeridae.	
Protopliomerella okeeffeae	Sp. nov	Valid	McAdams & Adrain	Ordovician (Floian)	Fillmore Limestone; Garden City Formation; Yellow Hill Limestone	United States	A member of the family Pliomeridae.	
Protopliomerella seegeri	Sp. nov	Valid	McAdams & Adrain	Ordovician (Floian)	Fillmore Limestone; Garden City Formation	United States	A member of the family Pliomeridae.	
Protopliomerella stegneri	Sp. nov	Valid	McAdams & Adrain	Ordovician (Floian)	Fillmore Limestone	United States	A member of the family Pliomeridae.	
Psalikilopsis newmani	Sp. nov	Valid	Adrain et al.	Ordovician (Floian)	Fillmore Limestone	United States	A member of the family Bathyuridae.	
Psalikilopsis paracuspidicauda	Sp. nov	Valid	Adrain et al.	Ordovician (Floian)	Fillmore Limestone; Yellow Hill Limestone	United States	A member of the family Bathyuridae.	
Psalikilopsis redfordi	Sp. nov	Valid	Adrain et al.	Ordovician (Floian)	Fillmore Limestone; Garden City Formation	United States	A member of the family Bathyuridae.	
Symphysurina ethingtoni	Sp. nov	Valid	Loch & Taylor	Late Cambrian and Early Ordovician	House Limestone	United States	A member of Asaphida belonging to the family Symphysurinidae.	
Symphysurina straatmannae	Sp. nov	Valid	Loch & Taylor	Late Cambrian and Early Ordovician	Bliss Formation; House Limestone; Wilberns Formation	United States	A member of Asaphida belonging to the family Symphysurinidae.	
