= Cambay Shale Formation =

Geologic formation in India

- Stratigraphic range: Early Eocene; ~55–54 Ma
- Type: Geological formation

Lithology
- Primary: Shale
- Other: Claystone; Siltstone; Sandstone

Location
- Region: Gujarat
- Country: India
- Cambay Shale Formation (India) Cambay Shale Formation (Gujarat)

The Cambay Shale Formation is an Early Eocene-aged geologic formation in the Cambay Basin, India. It varies in thickness from a few meters on the margins of the basin to more than 2,500m in the depressions. It directly overlies the Olpad Formation and is, in turn, overlain by the Anklesvar Formation in the southern part of the basin and by Kalol Formation in the northern part of the basin. Further north, the Cambay Shale, in its lower part, is gradually replaced by tongues of paralic-deltaic Kadi Formation and finally by Tharad Formation.

== Paleobiota ==
=== Vertebrates ===
==== Mammals ====
Anthracobunians from the Cambay Shale formation
Genus	Species	Stratigraphic position	Notes	Images
Cambaytherium	C. thewissi		A cambaytheriid.	
Cambaytherium	C. gracilis		A cambaytheriid.	
Cambaytherium	C. bidens		A cambaytheriid.	
Kalitherium	K. marinus		Another cambaytheriid.	
Indobune	I. vastanensis		A possible anthracobunid.	

Primates from the Cambay Shale formation
Genus	Species	Stratigraphic position	Notes	Images
Asiadapis	A. cambayensis		An Asiadapine.	
Asiadapis	A. tapiensis		An Asiadapine.	
Marcgodinotius	M. indicus		Another Asiadapine.	
Vastanomys	V. gracilis		A omomyid.	
Vastanomys	V. major		A omomyid.	

Hyaenodonts from the Cambay Shale formation
Genus	Species	Stratigraphic position	Notes	Images
Indohyaenodon	I.raoi		A hyaenodont.	

Dichobunids from the Cambay Shale formation
Genus	Species	Stratigraphic position	Notes	Images
Gujaratia	G. indica		A Diacodexeid.	
Gujaratia	G. pakistanensis		A Diacodexeid.	

Tapiromorphs from the Cambay Shale formation
Genus	Species	Stratigraphic position	Notes	Images
Cambaylophus	C. vastanensis		A tapiromorph.	
Vastanolophus	V. holbrooki		A tapiromorph.	

Cimolestans from the Cambay Shale formation
Genus	Species	Stratigraphic position	Notes	Images
Suratilestes	S. gingerichi		A cimolestan.	
Anthraconyx	A. hypsomylus		A esthonychid	

Bats from the Cambay Shale formation
Genus	Species	Stratigraphic position	Notes	Images
Archaeonycteris	A. storchi		A bat.	
Protonycteris	P. gunnelli		A bat.	
Cambaya	C. complexus		A bat.	
Hassianycteris	H. kumari		A bat.	
Icaronycteris	I. sigei		A bat.	
Jaegeria	J. cambayensis		A bat.	
Microchiropteryx	M. folieae		A bat.	

Other mammals from the Cambay Shale formation
Genus	Species	Stratigraphic position	Notes	Images
Frugivastodon	F. cristatus		A apatemyid.	
Indolestes	I. kalamensis		An adapisoriculid.	
Indodelphis	I. luoi		A opossum.	
Meldimys	M. musak		A rodent.	
Indonyctia	I. cambayensis		A nyctitheriid.	
Pahelia	P. mysteriosa		A herbivorous mammal of uncertain affinities.	

==== Birds ====
Birds from the Cambay Shale formation
Genus	Species	Stratigraphic position	Notes	Images
Vastanavis	V.eocaena		A parrot.	

==== Reptiles ====
Lizards from the Cambay Shale formation
Genus	Species	Stratigraphic position	Notes	Images
Indiagama	I. gujarata		A iguanian.	
Suratagama	S. neeraae		A iguanian.	
Tinosaurus	T. indicus		A iguanian.	
Vastanagama	V. susanae		A iguanian.	
Heterodontagama	H. borsukae		A priscagamid iguanian.	

Snakes from the Cambay Shale formation
Genus	Species	Stratigraphic position	Notes	Images
Platyspondylophis	P. tadkeshwarensis		A Madtsoiid.	
Russellophis	R. crassus		A russelophiid.	
Procerophis	P. sahnii		A snake.	
Thaumastophis	T. missiaeni		A snake.	
Palaeophis	P. vastaniensis		A paleophiid snake.	

==== Amphibians ====
Amphibians from the Cambay Shale formation
Genus	Species	Stratigraphic position	Notes	Images
Eobarbourula	E. delfinoi		A toad.	
Indorana	I.prasadi		A frog.	

==== Ray-finned fish ====
Ray-finned fish from the Cambay Shale formation
Genus	Species	Stratigraphic position	Material	Notes	Images
Avitoplectus	A. molaris		Lower jaw	A bizarre tetraodontiform.	
Diodon	D. sp.		Teeth	A porcupinefish.	
Egertonia	E. sp.		Teeth	A phyllodontid elopomorph.	
?Enchodus	?E. sp.		Teeth	An enchodontid aulopiform. Among the latest known remains of this otherwise Cretaceous genus, but may potentially represent reworked material from lower layers.	
Eotrigonodon	E. indicus		Teeth	A pycnodont.	
Eutrichiurides	E. sp.		Teeth	A cutlassfish.	
Osteoglossidae indet.			Teeth, scales	A bonytongue.	
Sphyraena	S. sp.		Teeth	A barracuda.	
Stephanodus	S. lybicus		Teeth	A pycnodont.	

=== Arthropods ===
==== Crabs ====
Crabs from the Cambay Shale formation
Genus	Species	Stratigraphic position	Notes	Images
Philyra	P. karkata		A leucosiid crab.	

==== Insects ====
Beetles from the Cambay Shale formation
Genus	Species	Stratigraphic position	Notes	Images
Protoclaviger	P.trichodens		A Beetle.	
Cambaltica	C. paleoindica		A Flea Beetle.	
Paleosorius	P. cambayensis		A Rove Beetle.	

Hemipterans from the Cambay Shale formation
Genus	Species	Stratigraphic position	Notes	Images
Heteromargarodes	H. hukamsinghi		A sand pearl.	
Heteromargarodes	H. americanus		A sand pearl.	
Normarkicoccus	N. cambayae		A diaspidid scale insect.	

Neuropterans from the Cambay Shale formation
Genus	Species	Stratigraphic position	Notes	Images
Spiloconis	S. sexguttata		A Aleuropterygine Coniopterygid.	
Spiloconis	S. glaesaria		A Aleuropterygine Coniopterygid.	
Spiloconis	S. oediloma		A Aleuropterygine Coniopterygid.	
Spiloconis	S. eominuta		A Aleuropterygine Coniopterygid.	

Bees from the Cambay Shale formation
Genus	Species	Stratigraphic position	Notes	Images
Melikertes	M. (Paramelikertes) gujaratensis		A bee.	
Melikertes	M. (Melikertes) kamboja		A bee.	

Wasps from the Cambay Shale formation
Genus	Species	Stratigraphic position	Notes	Images
Trichelyon	T. tadkeshwarense		A braconid wasp.	

Termites from the Cambay Shale formation
Genus	Species	Stratigraphic position	Notes	Images
Nanotermes	N. isaacae		A termitid termite.	
Prostylotermes	P. kamboja		A Stylotermitid termite.	
Parastylotermes	P. krishnai		A Stylotermitid termite.	
Zophotermes	Z. ashoki		A Rhinotermitid termite	

Flies from the Cambay Shale formation
Genus	Species	Stratigraphic position	Notes	Images
Sycorax	S. longistyla		A moth fly.	
Phlebotoiella	P. eoindianensis		A moth fly of unceritian affinities.	
Dicranomyia	D. (Dicranomyia) indica		The oldest known Crane fly and tipulomorph.	
Stempellina	S.pollex		A non-biting midge	
Stempellina	S.stebneri		A non-biting midge	
Tanytarsus	T.forfex		A non-biting midge	
Tanytarsus	T.ramus		A non-biting midge	
Camptopterohelea	C. odora		A non-biting midge	
Eohelea	E. indica		A biting midge	
Gedanohelea	G. gerdesorum		A biting midge	
Indorrhina	I.sahnii		A biting midge	
Lygistorrhina	L. indica		A biting midge	
Meunierohelea	M. borkenti		A biting midge	
Meunierohelea	M. cambayana		A biting midge	
Meunierohelea	M. orientalis		A biting midge	
Palaeognoriste	P. orientale		A biting midge	

Webspinners from the Cambay Shale formation
Genus	Species	Stratigraphic position	Notes	Images
Kumarembia	K. hurleyi		One of the few fossil Webspinners known.	

==== Arachnids ====
Whip spiders from the Cambay Shale formation
Genus	Species	Stratigraphic position	Notes	Images
Paracharonopsis	P. cambayensis		A Paracharontid.	

=== Plants ===
Plants from the Cambay Shale formation
Genus	Species	Stratigraphic position	Notes	Images
Pterospermoxylon	P. suratensis		An angiosperm.	
Anthocephalophyllum	A. vastanicum		An angiosperm.	
Ebenoxylon	E. cambayense		An angiosperm.	
Gardeniophyllum	G. cambayum		An angiosperm.	
Calophyllaceophyllum	C. eocenicum		An angiosperm.	
Carallioipollenites	C. integerrimoides		An angiosperm known from fossilised pollen.	
Gynocardia	G. eocenica		An angiosperm.	

Color key: Taxon / Reclassified taxon / Taxon falsely reported as present / Dubious taxon or junior synonym / Ichnotaxon / Ootaxon / Morphotaxon	Notes; Uncertain or tentative taxa are in small text; ~~crossed out~~ taxa are discredited.
