= Cambay amber =

Amber deposits in India

The Cambay amber are deposits of amber that are located in Cambay, western India that dates back to the early Eocene epoch around 52-50 million years ago. It occurs in lignitic and muddy sediments concentrated by near-shore chenier systems.

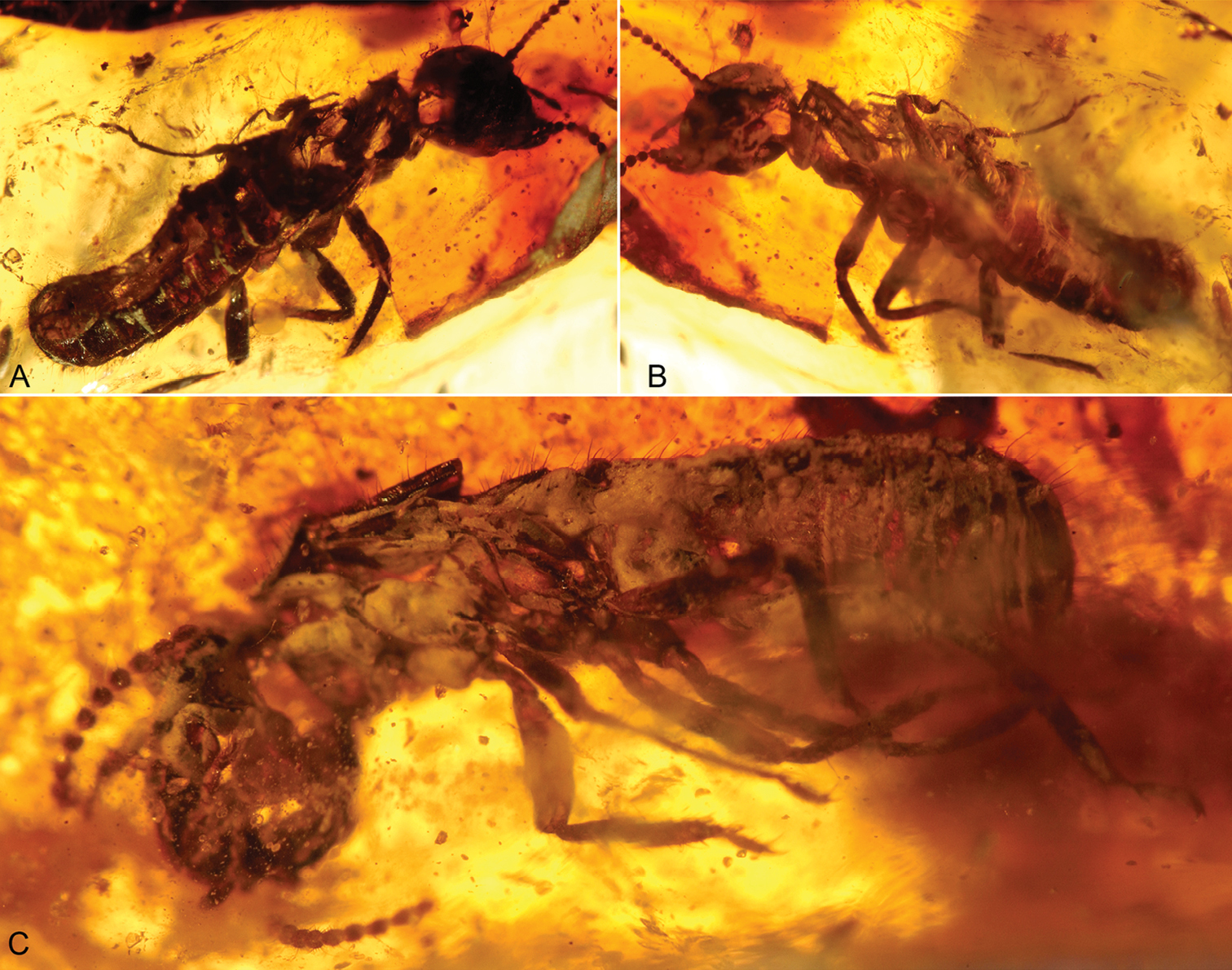
Amber from the Cambey Amber deposits preserving Prostylotermes kamboja

The amber was being deposited during an important time in Earth's history as the peak of the Early Eocene Climatic Optimum (EECO) was occurring. It was also deposited during a geologically and tectonically important time in the history of India. At this time, India was colliding into the continent of Asia undoubtedly causing significant biotic interchange between both landmasses with India acting as a “biotic ferry”. This means that the Cambrey amber deposits could be helpful in aiding in the understanding of the biotic interchange between India and Asia during this time.

During India's drift northwards, it triggered extensive volcanism causing extinction events on the subcontinent. This is likely what led to the disappearance of many lineages originating from Gondwana and explaining why many species originate from Laurasia.

== Biota ==
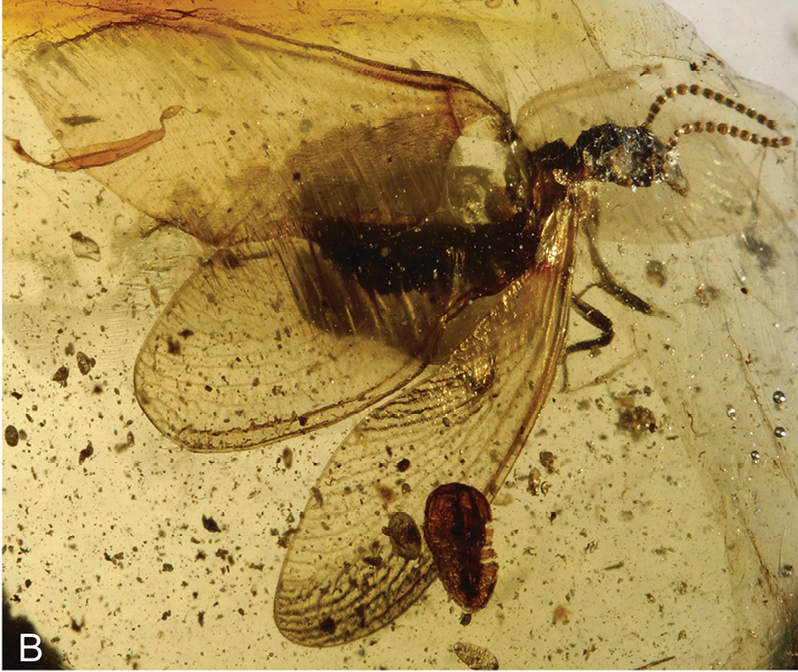
Parastylotermes krishnai

The anatomy and chemistry of associated wood fossils indicate a definitive source of plants that are part of Dipterocarpaceae family.

=== Arthropods ===
The amber of this deposit are partially polymerized and readily dissolves in organic solvents. This allows for the extraction of whole insects from the amber. There have been fourteen orders, more than 55 families and 100 arthropod species that have been found here. This diversity also includes many eusocial species of insects including corbiculate bees, rhinotermitid termites, and modern subfamilies of ants. This shows that groups of eusocial insects radiated in diversity during the Early Eocene Climatic Optimum or just prior to it during the Paleocene-Eocene Thermal Maximum (PETM).

==== Isoptera ====
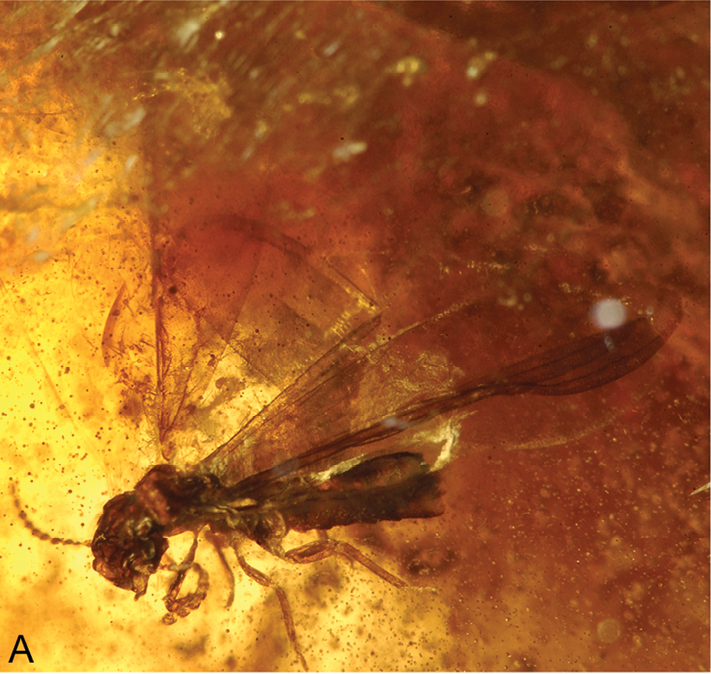
Nanotermes isaacae

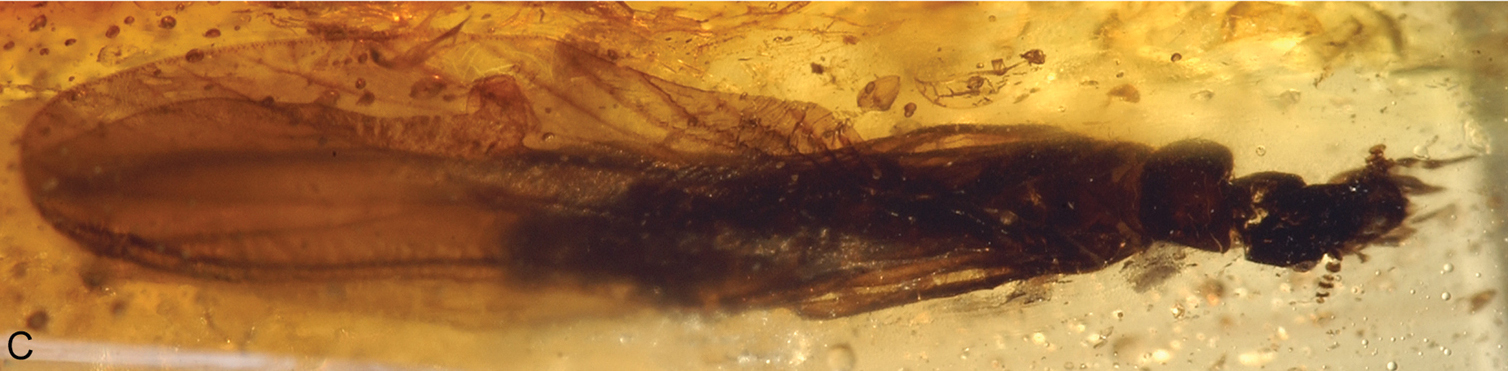
Zophotermes ashoki

Termite species have been described in the amber deposited. They include Parastylotermes krishnai, Prostylotermes kamboja, Zophotermes ashoki and Nanotermes isaacae. Together these species represent some of the earliest Tertiary records of termites and the oldest definitive record of Termitidae. Many of these species show affinities with Laurasian lineages.

==== Ephemeroptera ====
Mayflies have also been discovered in the Cambay amber deposits. The first to be discovered was Aikahika veta belonging to the family Leptophlebiidae. A. veta currently represents the oldest unambiguous occurrence of Atalophleboculata and is also one of the few Gondwanan survivors from large amounts of volcanism on the Indian plate.

==== Chironomidae ====
The presence of insects belonging to the fly family Chironomidae also exist here. They are similar to those found in Dominican Amber except Podonominae is found in the Cambay amber deposits and not in Dominica. Members include Chironominae (Lauterborniella, Microtendipes, Parachironomus, Stempellina, Stempellinella and Tanytarsus), Orthocladiinae (Corynoneura and Pseudosmittia) Paraboreochlus and Prodiamesa. The presence and diversity of Chironomidae in these deposited indicates that there was the presence of freshwater habitats and standing water bodies as well as springs in this region.
