= Termitaradus avitinquilinus =

Termitaradus avitinquilinus Temporal range: Burdigalian?

Scientific classification
- Domain: Eukaryota
- Kingdom: Animalia
- Phylum: Arthropoda
- Class: Insecta
- Order: Hemiptera
- Suborder: Heteroptera
- Family: Termitaphididae
- Genus: Termitaradus
- Species: †T. avitinquilinus

Binomial name
- †Termitaradus avitinquilinus Grimaldi & Engel, 2008

Extinct species of true bug

Termitaradus avitinquilinus is an extinct species of termite bug in the family Termitaphididae known from several possibly Miocene fossils found in the Dominican Republic. T. avitinquilinus is the first species in the genus Termitaradus to have been described from fossils found in Dominican amber and is one of four species from New World amber, the others being Termitaradus protera, Termitaradus dominicanus and Termitaradus mitnicki.

== History and classification ==
Termitaradus avitinquilinus is known from a group of three fossil insects which are inclusions in transparent chunks of Dominican amber. The amber was produced by the extinct Hymenaea protera, which formerly grew on Hispaniola, across northern South America and up to southern Mexico. The holotype amber specimen, DR-14-425, is currently housed in the amber fossil collection of the American Museum of Natural History in New York City, while the two paratype specimens are in the private Morone amber collection in Turin, Italy. The holotype fossil is composed of a complete adult individual that was collected from an unidentified amber mine in fossil-bearing rocks in the Cordillera Septentrional mountains of northern Dominican Republic. The amber dates from at least the Burdigalian stage of the Miocene, based on studying the associated fossil foraminifera and may be as old as the Middle Eocene, based on the associated fossil coccoliths. This age range is due to the host rock being secondary deposits for the amber and the Miocene the age range is only the youngest that it might be. The fossil was examined by paleoentomologists David Grimaldi and Michael S. Engel, both of the American Museum of Natural History. Grimaldi and Engel's 2008 type description of the new species was published in the natural sciences journal American Museum Novitates. The specific epithet avitinquilinus from the Latin word "avitus" meaning ancestral and the word"inquilinus" which translates to lodger.

The two paratype specimens are preserved in a single piece of amber in close association with a worker caste Mastotermes electrodominicus termite. It was suggested by Grimaldi and Engel that T. avitinquilinus cohabited with M. electrodominicus. Modern termite bugs live in the nests of rhinotermitid termites, and this is the first and only known association of termite bugs and Mastotermes termites.

== Description ==
The Termitaradus avitinquilinus holotype is a female with a total length of 3.7 millimetres (0.15 in) and a width of 2.24 millimetres (0.088 in), which is close to the size range seen in living Termitaradus species. The overall coloration of T. avitinquilinus is a reddish brown which is lighter in tone along the body margin and darkening towards the body center. The head has small antennae that are composed of four antennomeres. T. avitinquilinus has each side of the body is segmented into fourteen distinct lobes. Each of the lobes is divided into between four and possibly as much fifteen lobules with triangular to lance shaped setae along the edges of the insect. While some other Termitaradus species have a grouping of thick setae in a comb like structure on the tibia of the front most leg, this structure is absent in ''T. . It has been suggested these grouping of setae may be grooming combs in the living species. T. avitinquilinus is the shortest species of Termitaradus, with the two other Dominican amber species being longer. T. mitnicki is longer at 5.8 millimetres (0.23 in) and T. dominicanus is the longest Dominican amber species at 6.4 millimetres (0.25 in) long. The largest amber species, and largest species in the genus, is T. protera at 7.1 millimetres (0.28 in) long.
