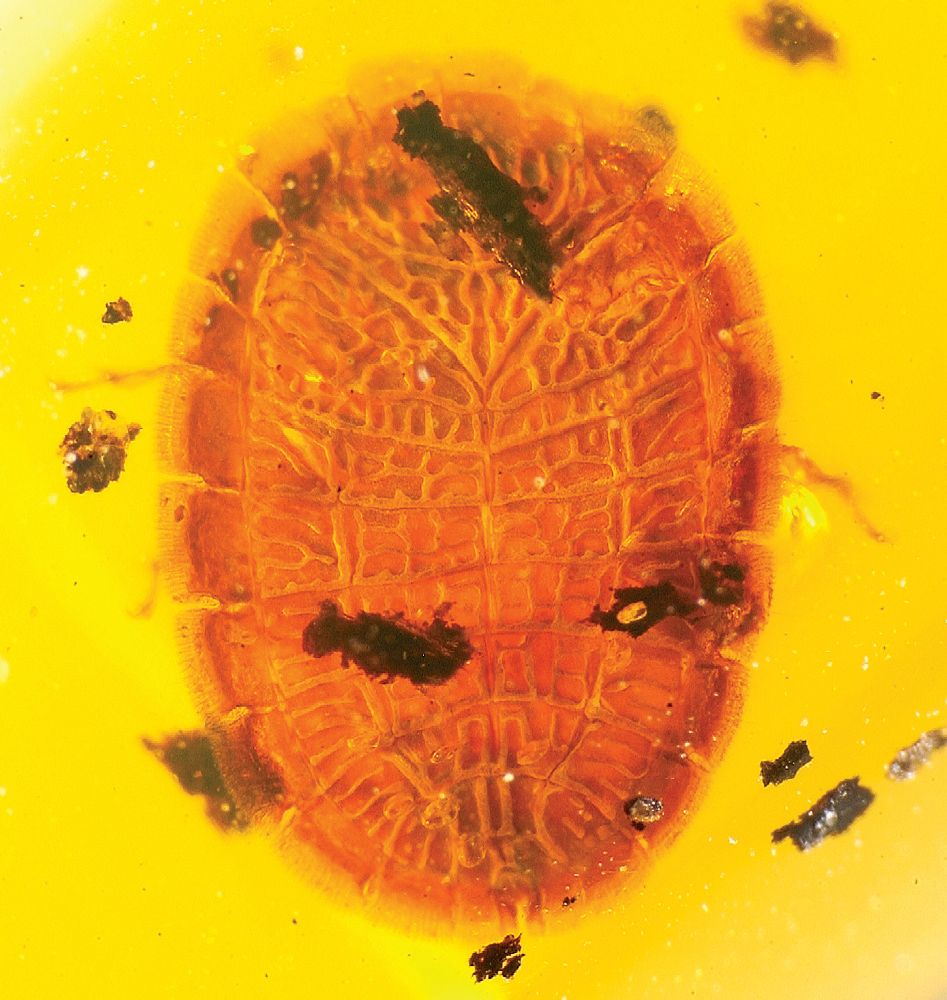
- Termitaradus mitnicki female in Dominican amber

Scientific classification
- Kingdom: Animalia
- Phylum: Arthropoda
- Clade: Pancrustacea
- Class: Insecta
- Order: Hemiptera
- Suborder: Heteroptera
- Family: Termitaphididae
- Genus: Termitaradus; Myers, 1924

Species
- see text

= Termitaradus =

Genus of true bugs

Termitaradus is a small tropicopolitan genus of true bugs placed in the family Termitaphididae. As is typical for the family, living members of Termitaradus are small, being an average of 2 millimetres (0.079 in) to 4 millimetres (0.16 in), and flattened with laminae extending out from each body segment giving a round scale like appearance. The same is true for the extinct species with the exception of T. protera which reaches 7 millimetres (0.28 in) in length. All members of Termitaphididae are inquilines lodging in the nests of host species of termites, with Termitaradus species known only from the family Rhinotermitidae. Though considered a separate family in Aradoidea it has been suggested by Drs David Grimaldi and Michael Engel in 2008 that Termataphididae may in fact be highly derived members of Aradidae. The second genus placed in Termitaphididae, Termitaphis, contains the monotypic species Termitaphis circumvallata which inhabits nests of Termitidae (termites) in Colombia.

== Species ==
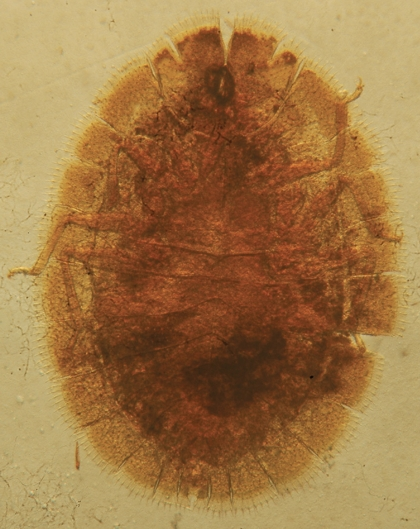
Termitaradus poleoae

The nine living species are found worldwide in the tropical regions of Central and South America, Africa, Asia, and Australia while three extinct species are known from Miocene Dominican amber and the third from Late Oligocene to Early Miocene Mexican amber.

- T. annandalei
- T. australiensis
- †T. avitinquilinus (Dominican Amber)
- †T. dominicanus (Dominican amber)
- T. guianae
- T. jamaicensis
- T. mexicana
- †T. mitnicki (Dominican amber)
- T. panamensis
- T. poleoae
- †T. protera (Mexican amber)
- T. subafra
- T. trinidadensis
