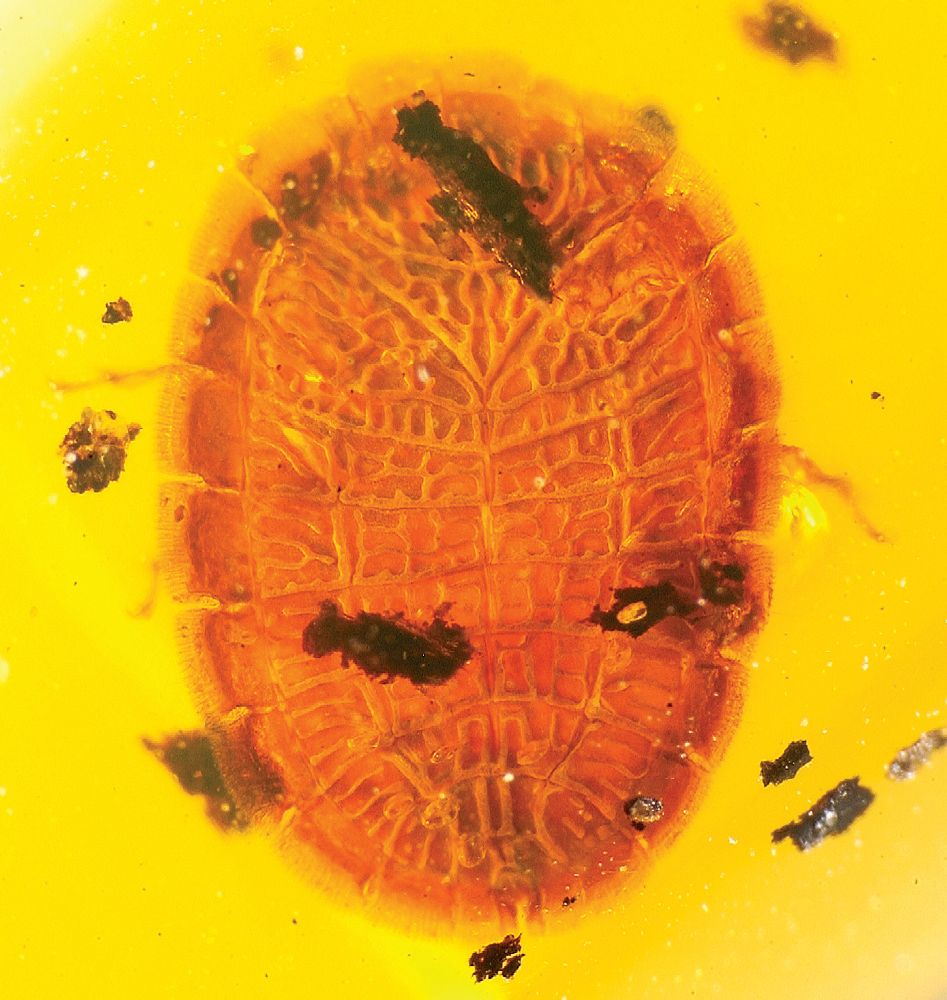
- Termitaradus mitnicki holotype female in Dominican amber

Scientific classification
- Kingdom: Animalia
- Phylum: Arthropoda
- Clade: Pancrustacea
- Class: Insecta
- Order: Hemiptera
- Suborder: Heteroptera
- Family: Termitaphididae
- Genus: Termitaradus
- Species: †T. mitnicki

Binomial name
- †Termitaradus mitnicki Engel, 2009

= Termitaradus mitnicki =

Termitaradus mitnicki Temporal range: Burdigalian?

Extinct species of true bug

Termitaradus mitnicki is an extinct species of true bug in the family Termitaphididae known only from early Miocene Burdigalian stage Dominican amber deposits on the island of Hispaniola.

The species is known from the holotype, number "KU-DR-023", a single female specimen currently deposited in the University of Kansas Natural History Museum collections in Lawrence, Kansas, where it was studied and described by Michael S. Engel. Engel published his 2009 type description for T. mitnicki in journal ZooKeys volume number 25. The species name mitnicki honors Tyler Mitnick, nephew of the specimen donor.

T. mitnicki is the third species of Termitaradus to be identified from the fossil record and the one of three species identified from Dominican amber, the other two being T. avitinquilinus, described earlier in 2009 and T. dominicanus described in 2011. The eight living species are found worldwide in the tropical regions of Central and South America, Africa, Asia, and Australia. It is probable that T. mitnicki, like modern species of Termitaradus, was inquiline, living in the nests of host species of termites, though the host species is unknown. Modern species of Termitaradus, where the host termite is known, live with members of the family Rhinotermitidae, however a possible host of T. avitinquilinus is the extinct termite Mastotermes electrodominicus, the type specimens being preserved associated with a worker M. electrodominicana.

While modern Termitaradus species are small, being an average of 2 to 4 millimetres (0.079 to 0.157 in), T. mitnicki is the third largest species known at 5.8 mm long. The second largest is T. dominicanus at 6.4 millimetres (0.25 in) and the largest species is the Miocene Mexican amber species T. protera with a length of 7.1 millimetres (0.28 in). Typical of Termitaradus, T. mitnicki is flattened with laminae extending out from each body segment, giving a round, scale-like appearance confirming the genus placement. The other genus in Termataphididae, Termitaphis, has an egg-shaped body rather than the flattened body of Termitaradus species. T. mitnicki can be identified from other species through several characteristics, notably the distinctive network of ridges on the top of the insect, which do not extend to the edges of the laminae. The general coloration is reddish-brown, lightening as towards the edges of the laminae with pale yellow setae.
