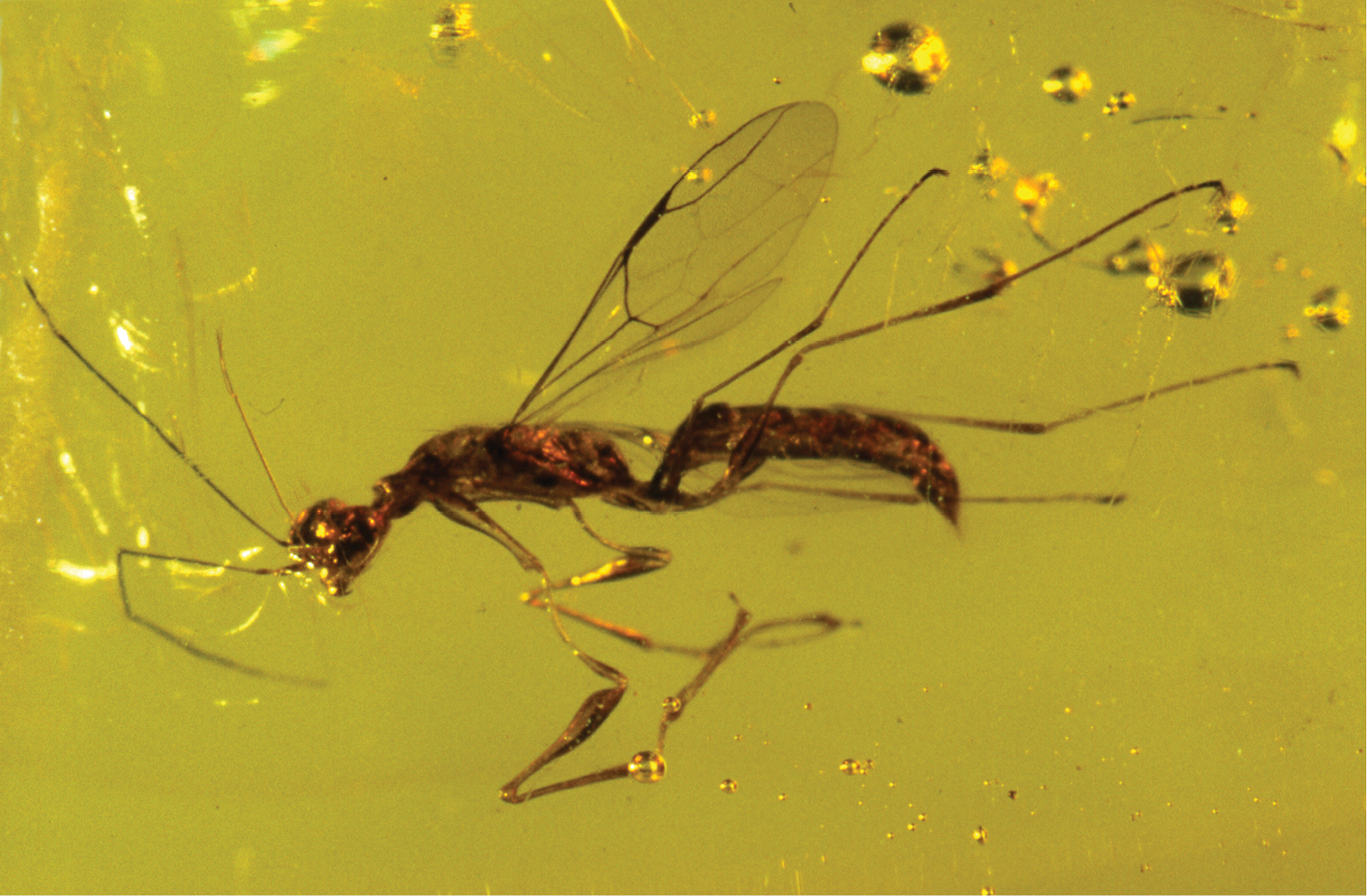
- Dryinus grimaldii

Scientific classification
- Domain: Eukaryota
- Kingdom: Animalia
- Phylum: Arthropoda
- Class: Insecta
- Order: Hymenoptera
- Family: Dryinidae
- Genus: Dryinus
- Species: †D. grimaldii

Binomial name
- †Dryinus grimaldii Olmi, 1995

= Dryinus grimaldii =

Dryinus grimaldii Temporal range: Burdigalian Burdigalian

Extinct species of insect

Dryinus grimaldii is an extinct species of wasp in the dryinid genus Dryinus. The species is solely known from the early Miocene, Burdigalian stage, Dominican amber deposits on the island of Hispaniola.

== History and classification ==
Dryinus grimaldii is known from a total of five female fossils, the holotype, specimen number "AMNH, No. DR-10-1426" and paratype, specimen number "AMNH, No. DR-10-1423". Three additional specimens, two labeled "H-10-23C" and one labeled "H-10-100", were identified later and were used in a redescription of the species. The holotype and paratype specimens are composed of complete female specimens which are entombed in blocks of orange colored amber. The type specimens are currently preserved in the paleoentomology collections housed in the American Museum of Natural History, located in Manhattan, New York City, USA. The three additional specimens are part of the private amber collection maintained by George Poinar Jr. from Oregon State University in Corvallis, Oregon, USA. D. grimaldii was first studied by Massimo Olmi of the University of Tuscia, Viterbo, Lazio region, Italy. Olmi's 1995 type description of the new species was published in Redia: Journal of Entomology. Olmi coined the specific epithet grimaldii in honor of David Grimaldi, Curator of Invertebrate Zoology at the American Museum of Natural History. At the time of the species description, Dryinus grimaldii was only Dryinus species placed in the lamellatus species group to be described. In 2011 Olmi and Adalgisa Guglielmino redescribed D. grimaldii based on the type specimens and the three newly identified specimen in the Poinar collection. They also described a second Dominican amber lamellatus species, D. rasnitsyni which bring to fossil record for the species group to two.

== Description ==
Dryinus grimaldii females ranges in size from 4.3 to 6.3 millimetres (0.17 to 0.25 in) with an overall body coloration thought to have been brick-red to brownish-yellow. The chelae on the front pair of legs are modified into claws each with a pair of teeth just below the claw apex. The morphology of the claw is a key distinguishing feature between D. grimaldii and D. rasnitsyni, which has a much more spatulate shaped claw then that of D. grimaldii. The antennae of D. grimaldii are notably long, being over nine times the length of the head, with a filiform morphology. The ten antennomere segments have a coating of dense short hairs.
