= Termitaradus protera =

Termitaradus protera Temporal range: Late Oligocene – early Miocene

Scientific classification
- Domain: Eukaryota
- Kingdom: Animalia
- Phylum: Arthropoda
- Class: Insecta
- Order: Hemiptera
- Suborder: Heteroptera
- Family: Termitaphididae
- Genus: Termitaradus
- Species: †T. protera

Binomial name
- †Termitaradus protera Poinar & Doyen, 1992

Extinct species of true bug

Termitaradus protera is an extinct species of termite bug in the family Termitaphididae known from several Late Oligocene to Early Miocene fossils found in Mexico. T. protera is the only species in the extant genus Termitaradus to have been described from fossils found in Mexican amber and is one of four species from new world amber; the others are Termitaradus avitinquilinus, Termitaradus dominicanus and Termitaradus mitnicki. T. protera was also the first termite bug described from the fossil record.

== History and classification ==
Termitaradus protera is known from a series of fossil insects which are inclusions in transparent chunks of Mexican amber. An amber specimen, in the collection of W. Weitschat of Hamburg, Germany, has a total of five T. protera individuals preserved together with portions of seven worker caste termites. The amber was produced by the extinct leguminous tree Hymenaea mexicana, and has dimensions of 38 by 15 by 12 millimetres (1.50 by 0.59 by 0.47 in). Mexican amber is recovered from fossil-bearing rocks in the Simojovel region of Chiapas, Mexico. The amber dates from between 22.5 million years old, for the youngest sediments of the Balumtun Sandstone, and 26 million years old for the oldest La Quinta Formation. This age range straddles the boundary between the Late Oligocene and Early Miocene and is complicated by both formations being secondary deposits for the amber; the age range is therefore only the youngest that it might be. The fossil was examined by paleoentomologists George Poinar Jr. of Oregon State University and Ernst Heiss of Innsbruck, Austria; Poinar's description of the fossil was published in a 2011 article in the journal Palaeodiversity. The species was first studied and described by Poinar and John T. Doyen in 1992.

== Description ==
The individuals of Termitaradus protera in the 2011 specimen include three females and two individuals too incomplete to identify to sex. The holotype specimen described by Poinar and Doyen is 7.1 millimetres (0.28 in) long, while the three females of the 2011 specimen range from 6.0–6.5 millimetres (0.24–0.26 in) long. In both the 1992 holotype specimen and specimen numbers one and two in the 2011 fossil, each side of the body is segmented into fourteen distinct lobes. Each of the lobes is divided into between four and twelve lobules with circular to oblong outer margins along the edges of the insect. As with some other Termitaradus species, the tibia of the frontmost leg, called a protibia, has a grouping of thick setae in a comb-like structure. It has been suggested that these groupings of setae may be grooming combs in the living species. T. protera is the longest species of Termitaradus; the three Dominican amber species are shorter. T. dominicanus is the next longest species at 6.4 millimetres (0.25 in), with T. mitnicki 5.8 millimetres (0.23 in) long, and the smallest amber species is T. avitinquilinus at 3.6 millimetres (0.14 in).
