= Poinar =

Poinar is a surname. Notable people with the surname include:

- George Poinar Jr. (born 1936), American entomologist and writer
- Hendrik Poinar (born 1969), American evolutionary biologist, son of George
