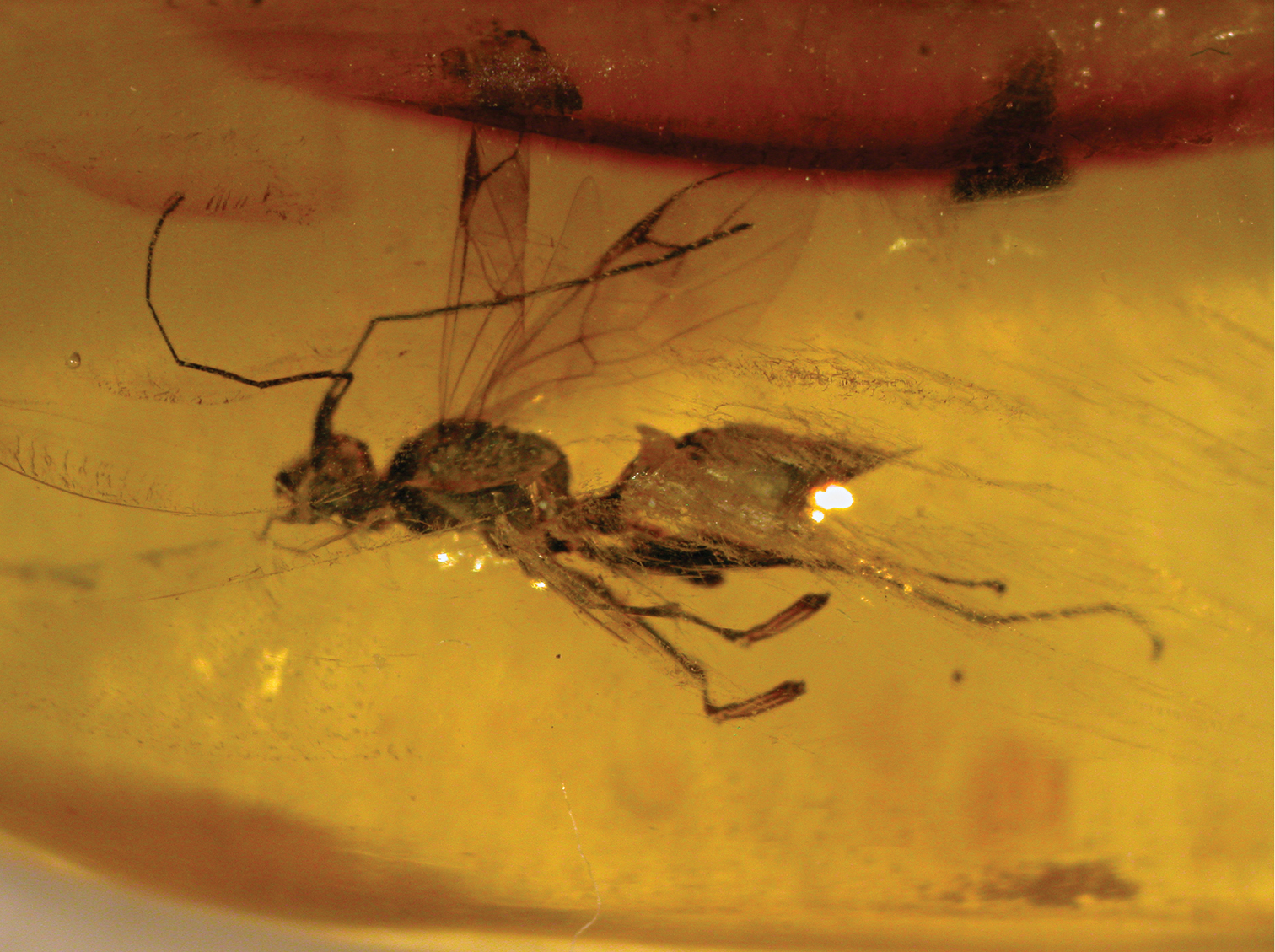
- Dryinus rasnitsyni holotype

Scientific classification
- Domain: Eukaryota
- Kingdom: Animalia
- Phylum: Arthropoda
- Class: Insecta
- Order: Hymenoptera
- Family: Dryinidae
- Genus: Dryinus
- Species: †D. rasnitsyni

Binomial name
- †Dryinus rasnitsyni Olmi & Guglielmino, 2011

= Dryinus rasnitsyni =

Dryinus rasnitsyni Temporal range: Burdigalian Burdigalian

Extinct species of insect

Dryinus rasnitsyni is an extinct species of wasp in the dryinid genus Dryinus. The species is solely known from the early Miocene, Burdigalian stage, Dominican amber deposits on the island of Hispaniola.

== History and classification ==
Dryinus rasnitsyni is known from a single fossil, the holotype labeled as "Oligo-Miocene amber from Dominican Republic (15–40 mybp)(SMSN)". The holotype fossil is composed of a complete female specimen that is entombed in a transparent yellow block of amber. The type specimen is currently preserved as part of the paleoentomology collections housed in the State Museum of Natural History Stuttgart, located in Stuttgart, Baden-Württemberg, Germany. D. rasnitsyni was first studied by Massimo Olmi and Adalgisa Guglielmino, both of the University of Tuscia, Viterbo, Lazio region, Italy. Olmi and Guglielmino's 2011 type description of the new species was published online and in print in the journal ZooKeys. Olmi and Guglielmino coined the specific epithet rasnitsyni in honor of the eminent Russian paleoentomologist, Alexandr Pavlovich Rasnitsyn. At the time of the species description, Dryinus rasnitsyni was only the second Dryinus species placed in the lamellatus species group to be described. The first species, D. grimaldii, was described by Olmi in 1995 from two specimens found in Dominican amber. In the 2011 paper describing D. rasnitsyni Olmi and Guglielmino also redescribed D. grimaldii based on the type specimens and the three newly identified specimen in the private amber collection of George Poinar Jr.

== Description ==
Dryinus rasnitsyni females are 7.4 millimetres (0.29 in) in total length with an overall body coloration thought to have been brown, though the head, chela, and palpi were a brick-red to brownish-yellow. The species is macropterous, with fore wings that are clear with a very slight darkening away from hyaline and hind-wings that are fully darkened. The chelae on the front pair of legs are modified into claws each with a pair of teeth just below the claw apex. The morphology of the claw is a key distinguishing feature between D. grimaldii and D. rasnitsyni, which has a much more spatulate shaped claw then that of D. grimaldii. The antennae of D. rasnitsyni are notably long, being approximately five times the length of the head, with a slight thickening towards the tip end. The ten antennomere segments have a coating of dense short hairs. The head of the type specimen is slightly crushed, limiting the amount of detail for the mandibles and clypus.
