= Stylotermes halumicus =

Scientific classification
- Kingdom: Animalia
- Phylum: Arthropoda
- Clade: Pancrustacea
- Class: Insecta
- Order: Blattodea
- Infraorder: Isoptera
- Family: Stylotermitidae
- Genus: Stylotermes
- Species: S. halumicus

Binomial name
- Stylotermes halumicus Liang, Wu, and Li, 2017

Species of termite

Stylotermes halumicus is a species of termite in the Isoptera family Stylotermitidae.

== Discovery ==
S. halumicus was the first species within the family Stylotermitidae to be discovered in Taiwan. Its discoverers first identified the species from the trunk of a living tree in Luanshan Village, Yanping Township, Taitung County. S. halumicus was named after the Bunun language word for pangolin, halum.

== Reproduction ==
A colony numbering less than fifty individuals held in a laboratory began reproducing within six months of captivity.
