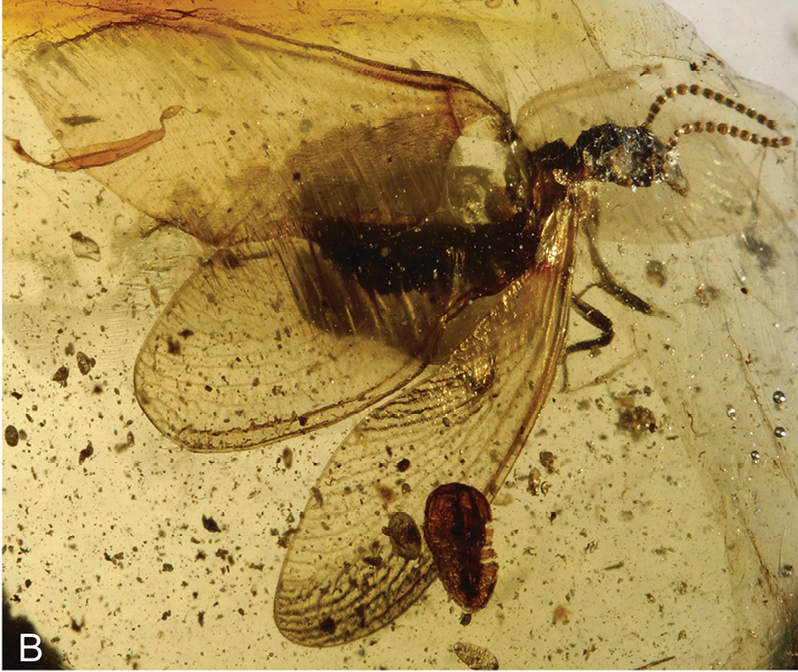
- P. krishnai holotype

Scientific classification
- Kingdom: Animalia
- Phylum: Arthropoda
- Clade: Pancrustacea
- Class: Insecta
- Order: Blattodea
- Infraorder: Isoptera
- Family: Stylotermitidae
- Genus: †Parastylotermes; Snyder and Emerson, 1949

Species
- see text

= Parastylotermes =

Parastylotermes Temporal range: Ypresian - Miocene

Extinct genus of termites

Parastylotermes is an extinct genus of termite in the Isoptera family Stylotermitidae known from North America, Europe, and India. The genus contains five described species, Parastylotermes calico, Parastylotermes frazieri, Parastylotermes krishnai, Parastylotermes robustus, and Parastylotermes washingtonensis.

== History and classification ==
Parastylotermes was first described by entomologists Thomas E. Snyder and Alfred E. Emerson in the 1949 paper Catalog of the termites (Isoptera) of the world. Prior to 1949, both P. washingtonensis and P. robustus were placed in separate modern species. Snyder and Emerson placed Parastylotermes in Stylotermitidae, which at that time was considered a subfamily, Stylotermitinae, of the family Rhinotermitidae.

== Species ==
=== P. robustus ===
P. robustus was the first species to be described, having been published by Baron Kurt von Rosen as Leucotermes robustus in 1913. Fossils of the species were recovered from the Middle Eocene, Lutetian, "Blue Earth" Baltic amber deposits, with three imagos and four isolated wings known. Of the five known specimens, the original type series of fossils that von Rosen used in describing the species were held in the Bayerische Staatssammlung für Paläontologie und Geologie collections and are thought destroyed during World War II. Von Rosen noted in his type description of the species that he was uncertain of its genus placement. Since then the species has been moved several first to Leucotermes (Reticulitermes) robustus, then to Reticulitermes robustus when Reticulitermes was changed from a subgenus to a full genus. Finally the species was transferred to Parastylotermes by Snyder and Emerson in 1949. P. robustus and P. krishnai are the only two species which are known from more than isolated wings. P. robustus can be distinguished from P. washingtonensis by is age and its shorter, wider, wings which are estimated to be 9.40 by 3.17 millimetres (0.370 by 0.125 in).

=== P. washingtonensis ===
P. washingtonensis, described by Snyder in 1931 as Stylotermes washingtonensis, is the type species for Parastylotermes. The species, like P. frazieri and P. calico, is known from a single isolated wing. The front right fore-wing was found in sediments of the Latah Formation near Spokane, Washington. The formation is dated to the Upper Miocene placing as similar in age to both other western North American species, both being middle Miocene in age. The specimen is housed as specimen MCZ 2943 ab in the Museum of Comparative Zoology on the Cambridge, Massachusetts grounds on Harvard University. At an estimated 10.72 millimetres (0.422 in) length from the costal suture to the tip and a full 11.5 millimetres (0.45 in), is one of the largest species of Parastylotermes, with P. calico estimated to have been slightly larger. The structuring of the median and cubitus veins are cited as the major differences between P. washingtonensis and P. calico.

=== P. frazieri ===
P. frazieri was the third species of Parastylotermes to be described and is known from a single wing collected in 1954 by T. H. McCulloh of the United States Geological Survey and deposited into the Smithsonian Institution as specimen number 62383. The wing was recovered from an 80 by 70 millimetres (3.1 by 2.8 in) calcium carbonate nodule recovered from the Frazier borax mine in Ventura county California. When Thomas Snyder described the specimen in 1955 he was uncertain whether the wing was in fact a fore-wing. The wing is 10 millimetres (0.39 in) long and 3.0 millimetres (0.12 in) wide and differs from P. washingtonensis in the placement of the median vein, which is farther from the cubitus vein in P. frazieri then in P. washingtonensis. In the time after the species description and reexamination of the type specimen by Emerson in 1971 the tip half of fossil has been lost, with only the basal half surviving.

=== P. calico ===
P. calico was the last North American species of Parastylotermes to be described, with William D. Pierce publishing the species description in 1958. The isolated wing fragment, LACM 533, from which the species was described was found in 1957 by Wilma Webster in the Calico Mountains, San Bernardino County, California. The nodule on which the fossil is preserved is housed in the L.A. County Museum. Due to the incomplete nature of the wing, being only the basal 7.8 millimetres (0.31 in) of the wing, it can not be determined if it was a fore or hind-wing though the apparent lack of an anal vein suggests that it may be a fore-wing. While agreeing with Pierce that the description of the wing as a separate species, Emerson noted that there were few features distinguishing P. calico from P. washingtonensis.

=== P. krishnai ===
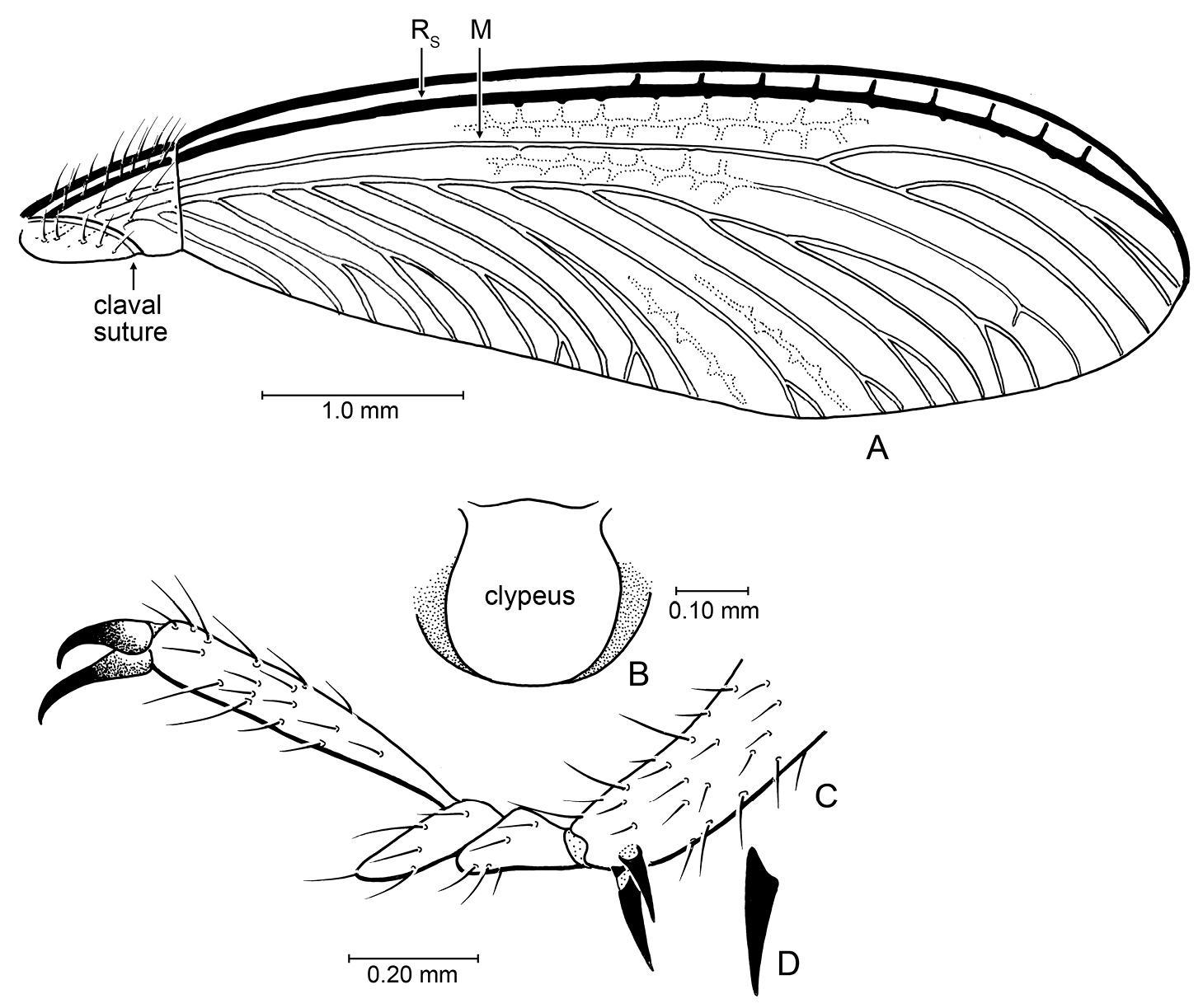
P. krishnai wing and leg detail

P. krishnai is known from two adults, which are inclusions in amber, making it the second species known from amber inclusions. The holotype amber specimen, number Tad-277, is currently housed in the fossil collection of the Birbal Sahni Institute of Palaeobotany in Lucknow, India and the second known adult, Tad-96 is in the collections of the American Museum of Natural History. The holotype is composed of a mostly complete adult of indeterminate sex, whereas Tad-96 is a crushed adult, though enough features are present to strongly indicate its placement in P. krishnai. Cambay amber dates to between fifty and fifty-two million years old, placing it in the Early to Mid Ypresian age of the Eocene, and was preserved in a brackish shore environment. The amber formed from a dammar type resin which is produced mainly by trees in the family Dipterocarpaceae. The specimens were recovered from the Tadkeshwar lignite mine, located in Gujarat State, during collecting trips in January 2009 and 2010. The fossils were first studied by paleoentomologists Michael S. Engel and David Grimaldi.and their 2011 type description of the species was published in the journal ZooKeys. The specific epithet krishnai is in honor of Kumar Krishna, considered a world authority on fossil and living termites. The species has a body length of approximately 4.0 millimetres (0.16 in) and a fore-wing length of 5.7 millimetres (0.22 in) making it the smallest species known. P. krishnai also shows a distinct more basal placement of the Medial vein fork then seen in the other species with the wing tip preserved. A notable distinction between P. robustus and P. krishnai is difference in numbers of antenna segments. P. robustus has between sixteen and seventeen segments while P. krishnai has only fourteen.
