= Eickwortapis =

Eickwortapis Temporal range: Burdigalian

Scientific classification
- Kingdom: Animalia
- Phylum: Arthropoda
- Clade: Pancrustacea
- Class: Insecta
- Order: Hymenoptera
- Family: Halictidae
- Genus: †Eickwortapis
- Species: †E. dominicana

Binomial name
- †Eickwortapis dominicana Michener & Poinar, 1996

Extinct genus of bees

Eickwortapis is an extinct monotypic genus of sweat bee in the Halictidae subfamily Halictinae which contains the single species Eickwortapis dominicana.

The genus name Eickwortapis is derived from a combination of Eickwort in honor of halictid systematist Dr. George Eickwort and the Latin apis, meaning "bee". The species is named in reference to the Miocene (Burdigalian stage) Dominican amber from deposits on the island of Hispaniola which entombs the specimens. The species, averaging 5 millimetres (0.20 in) long, was described from two partial females and a single complete male specimen in one polished piece of amber which is housed in the Poinar Amber Collection at the University of California, Berkeley. The male is numbered "H 10-70" and designated the holotype, while the two females are numbered "H 10-70B" and ""H 10-70C" are both designated Paratypes. The amber specimens with the three bees was first studied by Drs Charles Michener & George Poinar. They published the type description in the Journal of the Kansas Entomological Society volume number 69 and published in 1996. The male is well preserved in a curled position with the metasoma and the posterior surface of the propodium visible. Female paratype "H 10-70B" is mostly complete however the majority of the head was removed during polishing of the amber, likewise the female paratype "H 10-70C" is also a partial due to the dorsum of the thorax and vertex being removed.

In general Eickwortapis has a blackish body with an indistinct metallic coloration, possibly brassy greenish. The wing veins and stigma of the females are black while those of the male are a brown tone. The underside of the males antenna are yellowish brown with the males legs being a brownish. Eickwortapis is one of only five Halictidae genera which are known from the Dominican amber record, and one of three which are totally extinct. Closely related to the extinct genus Nesagapostemon and the living Caenohalictus, Eickwortapis is placed with both in the halictid tribe Caenohalictini. It can be identified from Nesagapostemon and Caenohalictus by a group of features. The basal area of the Propodeum, not slanting in profile, is only half of the length of the vertical posterior surface in Nesagapostemon. Eickwortapis has a longer basal area on the Propodeum and it does slant in profile. The living species Caenohalictus eberhardorum has long hairs on the eyes and denser scopa. The Eickwortapis holotype is the only male halictid to have been documented from Dominican amber.
