= Termitaradus dominicanus =

Termitaradus dominicanus Temporal range: Burdigalian?

Scientific classification
- Kingdom: Animalia
- Phylum: Arthropoda
- Clade: Pancrustacea
- Class: Insecta
- Order: Hemiptera
- Suborder: Heteroptera
- Family: Termitaphididae
- Genus: Termitaradus
- Species: †T. dominicanus

Binomial name
- †Termitaradus dominicanus Poinar, 2011

Extinct species of true bug

Termitaradus dominicanus is an extinct species of termite bug in the family Termitaphididae known from a Miocene fossil found on Hispaniola. T. dominicanus is the third species in the genus Termitaradus to have been described from fossils found in Dominican amber after Termitaradus avitinquilinus and Termitaradus mitnicki.

== History and classification ==
Termitaradus dominicanus is known from a single fossil insect which is an inclusion in a transparent chunk of Dominican amber 13 by 10 by 5 millimetres (0.51 by 0.39 by 0.20 in) in size. The amber specimen, HE-4-52, is currently housed in the fossil collection of the University of California, Berkeley in Berkeley, California. The holotype fossil is composed of a complete adult individual that was collected from an unidentified amber mine between Puerto Plata and Santiago de los Caballeros. Dominican amber is recovered from fossil-bearing rocks in the Cordillera Septentrional mountains of the northern Dominican Republic. The amber dates from at least the Burdigalian stage of the Miocene, based on studying the associated fossil foraminifera, and may be as old as the Middle Eocene, based on the associated fossil coccoliths. Due to the host rock being secondary deposits for the amber, the age range is only the youngest that it might be. The holotype was first studied by paleoentomologists George Poinar Jr. of Oregon State University and Ernst Heiss of Innsbruck, Austria. Poinar's 2011 type description of the species was published in the paleontology journal Palaeodiversity. The specific epithet dominicanus was coined as a reference to the country of the type locality, the Dominican Republic.

== Description ==
The Termitaradus dominicanus holotype is a well preserved and complete female. The individual is estimated to have been 6.4 millimetres (0.25 in) long and 4.3 millimetres (0.17 in) wide with an overall dark brown coloration on its upperside and light brown on its underside. Each side of the body is segmented into fourteen distinct lobules, each with a group of between two and four setae in a hardened coating. The head has small antennae that are composed of four antennomeres. Termitaradus dominicanus differs from T. avitinquilinus which has terminal setae that are serrated and is smaller overall, being 3.6 millimetres (0.14 in). In contrast, T. mitnicki has a network of raised ridges on its upper side and a body plan that is divided into only thirteen lobes rather than fourteen as seen in T. dominicanus and has a single serrated seta per lobe. T. mitnicki is also slightly shorter in length at 5.8 millimetres (0.23 in) and the largest species is the Mexican amber species T. protera with a length of 7.1 millimetres (0.28 in).
