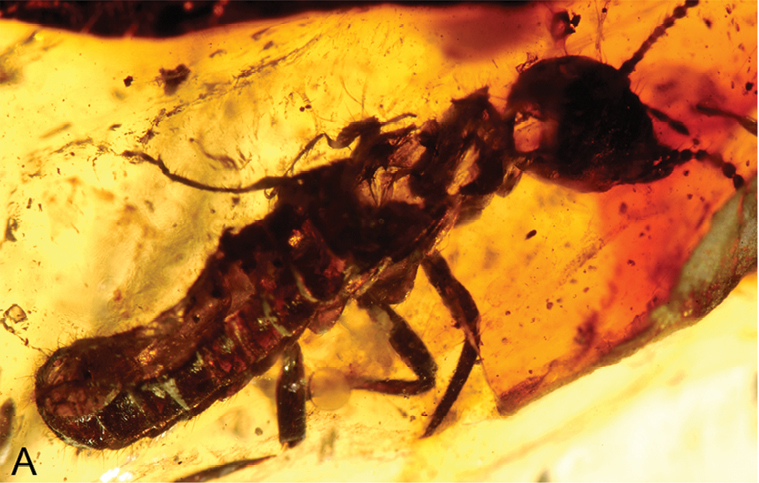
- female Prostylotermes kamboja

Scientific classification
- Domain: Eukaryota
- Kingdom: Animalia
- Phylum: Arthropoda
- Class: Insecta
- Order: Blattodea
- Infraorder: Isoptera
- Family: Stylotermitidae
- Genus: †Prostylotermes
- Species: †P. kamboja

Binomial name
- †Prostylotermes kamboja Engel & Grimaldi, 2011

= Prostylotermes =

Prostylotermes Temporal range: Ypresian

Extinct genus of termites

Prostylotermes is an extinct genus of termite in the isopteran family Stylotermitidae known from two Eocene fossils found in India. The genus contains a single described species, Prostylotermes kamboja.

== History and classification ==
Prostylotermes is known from only two fossils, the holotype female and a single paratype male, both of which are inclusions in a transparent chunk of amber. The amber, number "Tad-321C" is housed in the fossil collection of the Birbal Sahni Institute of Palaeobotany in Lucknow, India. Both the holotype and paratype are composed of mostly complete adult termites though some areas of the female were lost on the surface of the amber specimen. Cambay amber dates to between fifty and fifty-two million years old, placing it in the Early to Mid Ypresian age of the Eocene, and was preserved in a brackish shore environment. The amber formed from a dammar type resin which is produced mainly by trees in the family Dipterocarpaceae. The Prostylotermes type specimen was recovered from the Tadkeshwar lignite mine, located in Gujarat State, during a collecting trip during January 2010. The fossil was first studied by paleoentomologists Michael S. Engel and David Grimaldi, both of the American Museum of Natural History. Engel and Grimaldi's 2011 type description of the new genus and species was published in the online journal ZooKeys. The genus name Prostylotermes was coined as a combination of the Greek word pro meaning "before" and Stylotermes, the type genus of Stylotermitidae. The specific epithet kamboja is in reference to the Kamboja tribe of ancient India literature who settled the area now called Khambat and formerly called Cambay.

== Description ==
Both the Prostylotermes adults have an overall coloration which is uniform brown with no change on the legs or wing scales, but with a slight lightening on the side pleurons. The specimens are dealate, having already shed their wings before being trapped in the resin. The female has a length of 5.0 millimetres (0.20 in) and the male is 3.8 millimetres (0.15 in) in length. Adults have an almost circular head, with rounded compound eyes, and ocelli which are separated from the compound eyes. The antennae are formed from seventeen individual segments, with each segment gradually narrowing towards the antenna tip. Both male and female have short cerci which are composed of two segments, while only the male has short styli. The loss of a section of the abdominal wall on the female shows two eggs already developed and near the abdomen tip.
