= Scopoides catharius =

Scientific classification
- Kingdom: Animalia
- Phylum: Arthropoda
- Subphylum: Chelicerata
- Class: Arachnida
- Order: Araneae
- Infraorder: Araneomorphae
- Family: Gnaphosidae
- Genus: Scopoides
- Species: S. catharius

Binomial name
- Scopoides catharius (Chamberlin, 1922)

Synonyms
- Scopodes catharius Chamberlin, 1922; Scopodes catharinus Roewer, 1955

Species of spider

Scopoides catharius is a species of ground spider in the family Gnaphosidae. It is found in the United States.
