= Suratagama =

Suratagama Temporal range: Ypresian ~55–49 Ma

Scientific classification
- Domain: Eukaryota
- Kingdom: Animalia
- Phylum: Chordata
- Class: Reptilia
- Order: Squamata
- Suborder: Iguania
- Family: Agamidae
- Genus: †Suratagama; Rana et al., 2013

Type species
- †Suratagama neeraae Rana et al., 2013

Extinct genus of lizards

Suratagama is an extinct genus of agamid lizard known from the type species Suratagama neeraae from the early Eocene of India. It was named in 2013 on the basis of three isolated jaw bones from the Cambay Shale in Gujarat.
