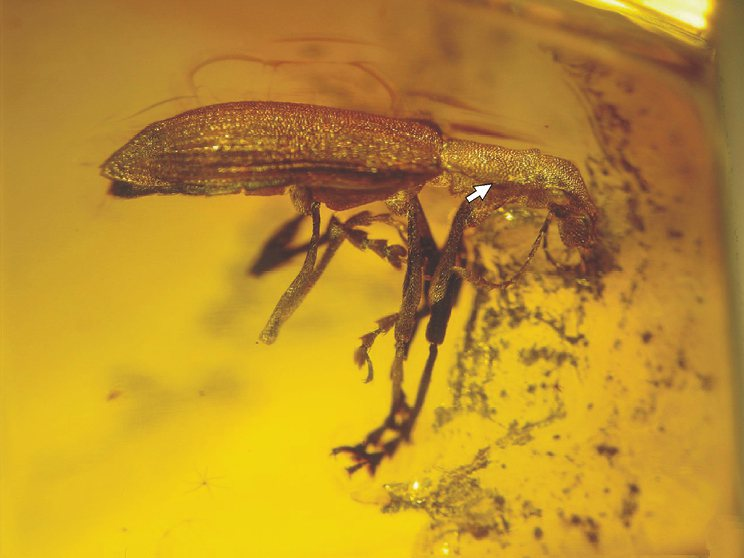

Scientific classification
- Kingdom: Animalia
- Phylum: Arthropoda
- Class: Insecta
- Order: Coleoptera
- Suborder: Polyphaga
- Infraorder: Cucujiformia
- Family: Curculionidae
- Genus: †Arostropsis
- Species: †A. groehni

Binomial name
- †Arostropsis groehni Yunakov & Kirejtshuk, 2011

= Arostropsis =

Arostropsis Temporal range: Upper Eocene

Genus of beetles

Arostropsis is an extinct genus of broad-nosed weevil in the beetle family Curculionidae known from an Upper Eocene fossil found in Europe. The genus contains a single described species, Arostropsis groehni.

== History and classification ==
Arostropsis is known only from a single fossil, the holotype, specimen number "C 7968, GPIH 4516", which is housed in the fossil collection of the Geology and Palaeontology Institute and Museum, part of the University of Hamburg. The specimen is composed of a fully complete adult male broad-nosed weevil which has been preserved as an inclusion in a transparent chunk of Baltic amber. Baltic amber dates to between forty and forty-five million years old and the holotype specimen was found in the Prussian Formation. The Arostropsis holotype was recovered from an amber quarry in Jantarny near the city of Kaliningrad along the Baltic Sea coast in Russia. The fossil was first studied by paleoentomologists Nikolai N. Yunakov and Alexander G. Kirejtshuk, both of the Russian Academy of Sciences. Yunakov and Kirejtshuk's 2011 type description of the new genus and species was published in the online journal ZooKeys. The genus name Arostropsis was coined by Yunakov and Kirejtshuk as a combination of two Greek words rōstron meaning "beak or snout" and opsis which means "resembling (something)" in combination with the negative prefix a. The specific epithet groehni was coined in honor of Carsten Gröhn who first collected the holotype specimen. Arostropsis is one of a number of broad-nosed weevils described from specimens in Baltic amber. As of the 2011 Yunakov and Kirejtshuk paper, at least eleven species had been described or suggested by paleoentomologists.

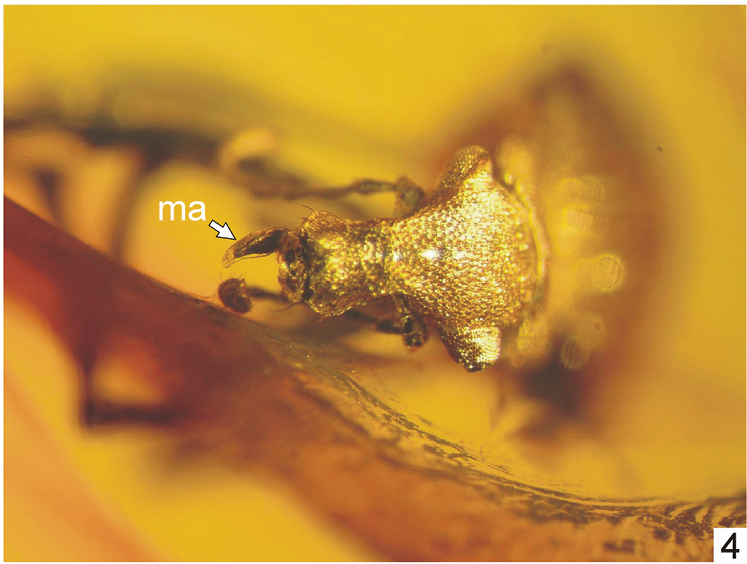
rostrum and mandible

== Description ==
The Arostropsis male adult has an overall coloration which appears to be metallic green and that is caused by numerous small lanceolate scales coating the legs and sides of the body. The male has an elongated body which is 6.4 millimetres (0.25 in) in length, 1.3 millimetres (0.051 in) tall, and with an overall width of 1.8 millimetres (0.071 in). The rostrum is approximately one and a half times as long as it is wide and is noted for being narrower than the rest of the head. Only the left mandible is still present and attached to the head and the tip section has a distinct curve and the mandible as a whole has a knife like shape. The legs are elongated and with the protibiae hosting a row of slender spines. The tip of the tibia, called the corbel, is open, lacking a second row of spines. Arostropsis is distinguished from the modern genera of Naupactini that have open corbels by the narrow rostrom and morphology of the antennae.
