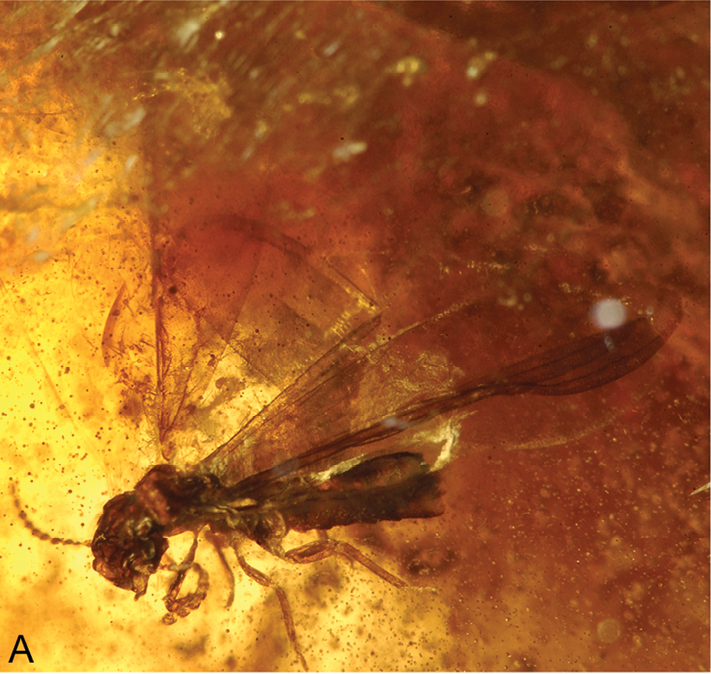
- N. isaacae holotype

Scientific classification
- Domain: Eukaryota
- Kingdom: Animalia
- Phylum: Arthropoda
- Class: Insecta
- Order: Blattodea
- Infraorder: Isoptera
- Family: Termitidae
- Genus: †Nanotermes
- Species: †N. isaacae

Binomial name
- †Nanotermes isaacae Engel & Grimaldi, 2011

= Nanotermes =

Nanotermes Temporal range: Ypresian

Extinct genus of termites

Nanotermes is an extinct genus of termites in the Isoptera family Termitidae known from only one Eocene fossil found in amber of the Cambay Basin (Gujarat, India). The genus contains a single described species, Nanotermes isaacae placed tentatively in the subfamily Termitinae.

== History and classification ==
Nanotermes is known from a single fossil, the holotype adult, which is an inclusion in a transparent chunk of Cambay amber. The amber specimen, "Tad-262", is currently housed in the fossil collection of the Birbal Sahni Institute of Palaeobotany in Lucknow, India. The holotype is composed of a mostly complete adult of indeterminate sex and minute overall size. Cambay amber dates to between 50 and 52 million years old, placing it in the Early to Mid Ypresian age of the Eocene, and was preserved in a brackish shore environment. The amber formed from a dammar type resin, which is produced mainly by trees in the family Dipterocarpaceae. The holotype specimen was recovered from the Tadkeshwar lignite mine, located in Gujarat State, during a collecting trip on 17–22 January 2010. The fossil was first studied by paleoentomologists Michael S. Engel and David Grimaldi, both of the American Museum of Natural History. Engel and Grimaldi's 2011 type description of the new genus and species was published in the online journal ZooKeys. The genus name Nanotermes was coined as a combination of the Greek word nanos meaning "small" and Termes, the type genus of the Termitidae. This is in reference to the size of the adult, which is noted as possibly the smallest termite adult known. The specific epithet isaacae is in honor of Charlotte Isaac, who discovered the holotype and "many other interesting inclusions". Nanotermes is the oldest member of the Termitidae to be described to date, with the prior oldest being from the Late Oligocene, 20 million years younger than the Cambay ambers.

== Description ==
Nanotermes adults have a coloration which ranges from dark brown on the majority of the head and abdomen, lightening to brown on the pronotum, labrum, and postclypeus. The color further pales on the legs and antennae to a light brown, and to a white strip along the labrum's apical margin. The holotype has a length of 2.0 mm (0.079 in) and sports wings that are 2.6 mm (0.10 in). Adults have a slightly oval head which is longer than wide with a sparse distribution of setae. The antennae are generally moniliform in structure, thus having an appearance similar to a string of beads. They are composed of 12 segments (flagellomeres), which gradually increase in diameter from the base to the antenna tip. This is the lowest number of antennal segments found in the Termitidae, with some modern Syntermitinae genera coming close, having 13 segments. The presence of three pairs of spurs on the tibia is considered unusual for the Termitinae, leading Engel and Grimaldi to leave the fossil's placement among the Termitinae tentative.
