= Indiagama =

Indiagama Temporal range: Ypresian ~55–49 Ma

Scientific classification
- Domain: Eukaryota
- Kingdom: Animalia
- Phylum: Chordata
- Class: Reptilia
- Order: Squamata
- Suborder: Iguania
- Family: Agamidae
- Genus: †Indiagama; Rana et al., 2013

Type species
- †Indiagama gujarata Rana et al., 2013

Extinct genus of lizards

Indiagama is an extinct genus of agamid lizard known from the type species Indiagama gujarata from the early Eocene of India. Indiagama was named in 2013 on the basis of a single lower jaw from the Cambay Shale in Gujarat. The rectangular shape of its teeth distinguish it from all other agamids, living and extinct.
