= Rhinotermes =

Scientific classification
- Domain: Eukaryota
- Kingdom: Animalia
- Phylum: Arthropoda
- Class: Insecta
- Order: Blattodea
- Infraorder: Isoptera
- Nanorder: Neoisoptera
- Family: Rhinotermitidae
- Subfamily: Rhinotermitinae
- Genus: Rhinotermes; Hagen 1858

Genus of termites

Rhinotermes is a genus of termites typical of the family Rhinotermitidae. Records of occurrence are largely from South America, but they also heve been found in southern Europe, Africa and on Pacific islands.

== Species ==
The Termite Catalogue and GBIF list the following:

1. Rhinotermes hispidus Emerson, 1925
2. Rhinotermes manni Snyder, 1924
3. Rhinotermes marginalis (Linnaeus, 1758)
4. †Rhinotermes miocenicus Nel & Paicheler, 1993
5. Rhinotermes nasutus (Perty, 1833)
6. Rhinotermes tarakanensis Oshima, 1914
