= Indohyaenodontinae =

Indohyaenodontinae Temporal range: 54.51–37.2 Ma Early to Late Eocene

Scientific classification
- Kingdom: Animalia
- Phylum: Chordata
- Class: Mammalia
- Infraclass: Placentalia
- Order: †Hyaenodonta
- Family: †Hyaenodontidae
- Subfamily: †Indohyaenodontinae; Solé, 2013

Type genus
- †Indohyaenodon Bajpai, 2009

Genera
- †Indohyaenodon; †Yarshea; †Kyawdawia; †Paratritemnodon

Extinct subfamily of mammals

Indohyaenodontinae is an extinct subfamily of placental mammals from the order Hyaenodonta. Fossil remains of these mammals are known from early to late Eocene deposits in Asia.

== Classification and phylogeny ==
=== Taxonomy ===
- Family: †Indohyaenodontinae (Solé, 2013)
  - Genus: †Indohyaenodon (Bajpai, 2009)
    - †Indohyaenodon raoi (Bajpai, 2009)
  - Genus: †Yarshea (Egi, 2004)
    - †Yarshea cruenta (Egi, 2004)
