= Indohyaenodon =

Indohyaenodon Temporal range: 54.51–54.5 Ma Early Eocene

Scientific classification
- Kingdom: Animalia
- Phylum: Chordata
- Class: Mammalia
- Infraclass: Placentalia
- Order: †Hyaenodonta
- Family: †Hyaenodontidae
- Subfamily: †Indohyaenodontinae
- Genus: †Indohyaenodon; Bajpai, 2009

Type species
- †Indohyaenodon raoi Bajpai, 2009

Genus of extinct placental mammals

Indohyaenodon ("Indian Hyaenodon") is an extinct monotypic genus of placental mammals from the subfamily Indohyaenodontinae. Originally it was hypothesized it was part of the family Hyaenodontidae, more recent analysis suggests it was part of the Afro-Arabian clade of hyaenodonts, being more closely related to the Hyainailouroidae. Indohyaenodon lived during the Early Eocene in Cambay Shale Formation of Gujarat, India.

== Palaeobiology ==
=== Locomotion ===
Indohyaenodon raoi was capable of arboreal locomotion. Evidence for this includes its peroneal tubercle of the calcaneus being proximally positioned and large, which would have enabled powerful curvature by the peroneal musculature at the expense of plantarflexion, its obliquely oriented and smoothly curved ectal facet on the calcaneus, which would have made the astragalocalcanear joint highly mobile, its very shallow astragalar facet on the tibia, which would have permitted parasagittal and transverse movements at the crurotarsal joint, and its long tibial crest, which gave its gracilis and semitendinosus muscles a high degree of leverage.
