= Platnickus =

Scientific classification
- Kingdom: Animalia
- Phylum: Arthropoda
- Subphylum: Chelicerata
- Class: Arachnida
- Order: Araneae
- Infraorder: Araneomorphae
- Family: Gnaphosidae
- Genus: Platnickus; Liu & Zhang, 2023

Type species
- Scopoides xizangensis Hu, 2001

Species
- 3, see text

Genus of spiders

Platnickus is a genus of spiders in the family Gnaphosidae.

== Etymology ==
The genus is named after influential arachnologist Norman I. Platnick (1951-2020). It was established while revising the genus Scopoides, originally erected by Platnick in 1989, separating the Chinese from the North American species of the genus.

== Distribution ==
Platnickus is endemic to Xizang and Sichuan provinces of China.

== Species ==
As of October 2025, this genus includes three species:

- Platnickus reni Liu & Zhang, 2023 – Sichuan
- Platnickus wanglangensis (Yuan, Zhao & Zhang, 2019) – Sichuan
- Platnickus xizangensis (Hu, 2001) – Xizang (type species)
