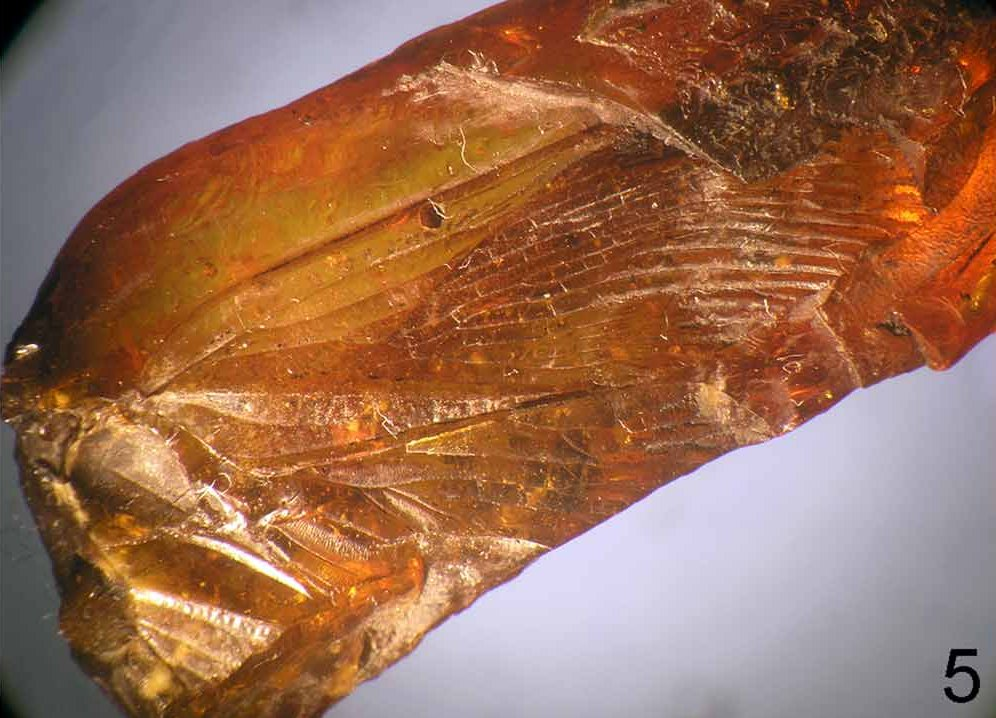
- Ordralfabetix sirophatanis holotype wing

Scientific classification
- Kingdom: Animalia
- Phylum: Arthropoda
- Class: Insecta
- Order: Hemiptera
- Suborder: Auchenorrhyncha
- Infraorder: Fulgoromorpha
- Family: Lophopidae
- Genus: †Ordralfabetix
- Species: †O. sirophatanis

Binomial name
- †Ordralfabetix sirophatanis Szwedo, 2011

= Ordralfabetix =

Ordralfabetix Temporal range: 55–53 Ma

Extinct genus of true bugs

Ordralfabetix is an extinct genus of planthoppers in the family Lophopidae and containing the single species Ordralfabetix sirophatanis. The species is known only from the Early Eocene, Ypresian stage Oise amber from the Quesnoy locality, Oise Department, France.

== History and classification ==
Ordralfabetix sirophatanis is known only from one fossil, the holotype, number "PA. 2378". It is a single partial adult preserved as an impression on the surface of a clear orange amber specimen. The fossil was recovered from an outcrop of Oise amber which was discovered in 1997 at Quesnoy, near the Oise River in Northern France. The type specimen is currently preserved in the entomology department of the French Muséum national d'histoire naturelle. Ordralfabetix was first studied by Jacek Szwedo of the Muséum with his 2011 type description for the genus and species being published in the journal Zootaxa. The generic name was coined by Szwedo in reference to The Adventures of Asterix character Ordralfabetix, the village fishmonger. The etymology of the specific epithet sirophatanis is a combination of two proto-Celtic word cores, "siro" which translates to "long" and "phatano" meaning "wing". This is a reference to the length of the fore wing.

When Ordralfabetix sirophatanis was described, it was one of three hundred identified arthropod species that have been found in the Oise ambers. Of the three hundred arthropod species, seven planthopper families are represented: Achilidae, Dictyopharidae, Lophopidae, Ricaniidae, Nogodinidae, and Tropiduchidae plus another family which has not been formally described. O. sirophatanis was the second Lophopidae species to be described from the fossil record of Europe. The first species Baninus thuringiorum was described by Szwedo and Wappler in 2006 from specimens found in the Messel fossil site.

== Description ==
The O. sirophatanis type specimen is a well-preserved almost complete adult left fore-wing, called a tegmen, plus portions of the head and pronotum, the right clavus and portions of the left hind-wing. The tip of the left fore-wing is still covered in a small amount of amber. The fore-wing has a total length of 17.9 millimetres (0.70 in) and at its widest it is 5.3 millimetres (0.21 in). Shorter than the fore-wing, the hind wing has an estimated length of 10.29 millimetres (0.405 in) while the width is not known. Similar to members of the Sarebasa+ group of genera in Lophopidae, such as Serida and Pyrilla, Ordralfabetix is separated from the other genera by the several characters. The distinct shape of the shallowly concave fore-wing with an elongated postclaval margin, called the tornus, and a rounded wing tip. The venation of the wing tip has distinct oblique subapical line of veinlets. The narrow costal area of the wing has veinlets running almost the entire length, excluding the base region, and is longer than the clavus.
