= Hendrik Poinar =

American biologist (born 1969)

Hendrik Nicholas Poinar (born May 31, 1969 in Utrecht, Netherlands) is an evolutionary biologist specializing in ancient DNA. Poinar first became known for extracting DNA sequences from ground sloth coprolites. He is currently director of the Ancient DNA Centre at McMaster University in Hamilton, Ontario.

== Education and academic career ==
The son of noted entomologist George Poinar Jr. and Eva Hecht-Poinar, Poinar received his B.S. and M.S. degrees from California Polytechnic University, San Luis Obispo in 1992 and 1999 respectively before earning a Ph.D. in 1999 from LMU Munich, after which he was a postdoctoral researcher from 2000 to 2003 at the Max Planck Institute for Evolutionary Anthropology in Leipzig, Germany. In 2003, he was hired as an assistant professor in the anthropology department at McMaster University in Canada.

In a joint 2000 paper in Science, Poinar and Dr. Alan Cooper argued that much existing work in human ancient DNA has not been sufficiently rigorous to prevent DNA contamination from modern human sources, and that many reported results for ancient human DNA may therefore be suspect.

In 2003, Poinar and others from the Max Planck Institute published genetic sequences isolated from coprolites of the extinct Shasta giant ground sloth, with an estimated age of 10500 years using radiocarbon dates. These were the first genetic sequences retrieved from any extinct ground sloth.

In September 2008, Poinar's laboratory published results showing that after a long period of separation in the mammoth populations of Siberia and North America, the Siberian mammoth population had been completely replaced by mammoths of North American origin.

In 2014, Poinar and colleagues published the first genomic data from victims of the Plague of Justinian in Bavaria, demonstrating that this plague was caused by a strain of Yersinia pestis now extinct.
