= Scopoides =

Scopoides Temporal range: Palaeogene–present

Scientific classification
- Kingdom: Animalia
- Phylum: Arthropoda
- Subphylum: Chelicerata
- Class: Arachnida
- Order: Araneae
- Infraorder: Araneomorphae
- Family: Gnaphosidae
- Genus: Scopoides; Platnick, 1989

Type species
- S. catharius (Chamberlin, 1922)

Species
- 15, see text

Genus of spiders

Scopoides is a genus of ground spiders that was first described by Norman I. Platnick in 1989, found in Mexico and the United States.

Two of the Chinese species originally part of this genus were moved to the newly described genus Platnickus in 2023, while the third was moved to genus Allozelotes.

== Species ==
As of October 2025, this genus includes twelve species:

- Scopoides asceticus (Chamberlin, 1924) – Mexico
- Scopoides bryantae (Platnick & Shadab, 1976) – United States, Mexico
- Scopoides cambridgei (Gertsch & Davis, 1940) – United States, Mexico
- Scopoides catharius (Chamberlin, 1922) – United States (type species)
- Scopoides gertschi (Platnick, 1978) – United States
- Scopoides kastoni (Platnick & Shadab, 1976) – United States, Mexico
- Scopoides naturalisticus (Chamberlin, 1924) – United States, Mexico
- Scopoides nesiotes (Chamberlin, 1924) – United States, Mexico
- Scopoides ochraceus (F. O. Pickard-Cambridge, 1899) – Mexico
- Scopoides rostratus (Platnick & Shadab, 1976) – Mexico
- Scopoides santiago (Platnick & Shadab, 1976) – Mexico
- Scopoides tlacolula (Platnick & Shadab, 1976) – Mexico
