= Protopliomerella =

Protopliomerella Temporal range: Tremadocian–Early Ordovician

Scientific classification
- Domain: Eukaryota
- Kingdom: Animalia
- Phylum: Arthropoda
- Class: †Trilobita
- Order: †Phacopida
- Family: †Pliomeridae
- Genus: †Protopliomerella; Harrington, 1957
- Species: †P. contracta

Binomial name
- †Protopliomerella contracta (Ross, 1951)

Extinct genus of trilobites

Protopliomerella is an extinct genus of trilobite in the family Pliomeridae. There is one described species in Protopliomerella, P. contracta.
