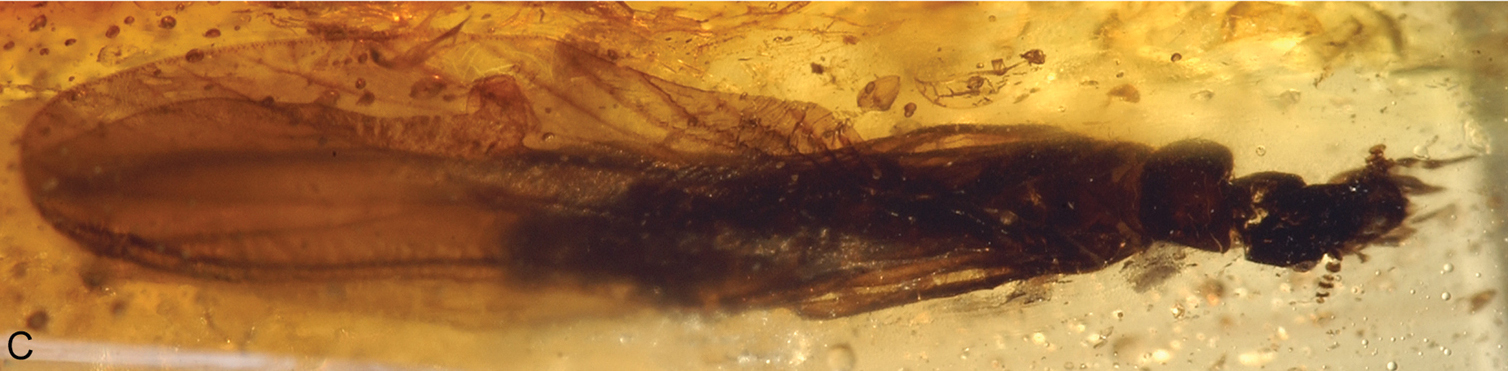
- Z. ashoki holotype

Scientific classification
- Kingdom: Animalia
- Phylum: Arthropoda
- Clade: Pancrustacea
- Class: Insecta
- Order: Blattodea
- Infraorder: Isoptera
- Family: Rhinotermitidae
- Genus: †Zophotermes
- Species: †Z. ashoki

Binomial name
- †Zophotermes ashoki Engel & Singh, 2011

= Zophotermes =

Zophotermes Temporal range: Ypresian

Extinct genus of termites

Zophotermes is an extinct genus of termite in the Isoptera family Rhinotermitidae known from two Eocene fossils found in India. The genus contains a single described species, Zophotermes ashoki.

== History and classification ==
Zophotermes is known from only two fossils, the holotype adult and an additional set of wings, both of which are inclusions in transparent chunks of amber. The amber specimens, numbers "Tad-42" and "Tad-97" respectively, are both housed in the fossil collection of the Birbal Sahni Institute of Palaeobotany in Lucknow, India. The holotype is composed of a mostly complete adult, though some areas show distinct compression from the amber after entombment and is of indeterminate sex. Four other specimens have been referred to Zophotermes, Tad-278, Tad-95, Tad-304, and SEMC-F000157. All are placed into Zophotermes with the notation that they may be specimens of Z. ashoki, but all are too incomplete for a confident placement to species. Cambay amber dates to between fifty and fifty-two million years old, placing it in the Early to Mid Ypresian age of the Eocene, and was preserved in a brackish shore environment. The amber formed from a dammar type resin which is produced mainly by trees in the family Dipterocarpaceae. Four of the six Zophotermes specimens was recovered from a Tadkeshwar lignite mine, located in Gujarat State, during collecting trips in January 2009 while the last two were found in the same mine on a collecting trip in January 2010. The fossils were first studied by paleoentomologists Michael S. Engel of the American Museum of Natural History and Hukam Singh of the Birbal Sahni Institute of Paleobotany. Engel and Singh's 2011 type description of the new genus and species was published in the online journal ZooKeys. The genus name Zophotermes was coined as a combination of the Greek word zophos meaning "gloom" or "nether world" and Termes, the type genus of Termitidae. The specific epithet ashoki is in honor of paleontologist Ashok Sahni, a colleague of the authors and a "sage of Indian paleontology".

== Description ==
Zophotermes adults have an overall coloration which ranges from dark reddish brown on the thorax and pronotum, dark brown on the abdomen, and very dark brown to black on the head with the antennae mouth parts being lighter brown. The holotype has a length of 4.9 millimetres (0.19 in) and sports wings that are 6.0 millimetres (0.24 in). Adults have a narrow oval head, with small round compound eyes, and ocelli which are separated from the compound eyes. The antennae are generally moniliform in structure, thus having an appearance similar to a string of beads. Due to the preservation of the specimen, the total number of antenna segments is unknown. The antenna segments which are visible show medium amounts of setae. The legs have a moderate amount of setae and the tibia hosts three pairs of spines, called tibial spurs. Both the abdomen and the wing bases have scattered setae, and the membrane of the wings is pimplate.
