= George Eickwort =

American entomologist

George Campbell Eickwort (8 June 1940 – 11 July 1994) was an American entomologist and a professor at Cornell University. He was a specialist on the Halictidae but was recognized for his teaching skills for which he was awarded a Distinguished Achievement Award in Teaching in 1986 from the Entomological Society of America.

Eickwort was born in New York State, and an early interest in insects led him to studies at the Michigan State University for his BS and MS (1963). He then joined the University of Kansas and obtained a Ph.D. in 1967. He subsequently joined Cornell University as an assistant professor. He would later become a full professor, and eventually Chairman of Entomology. He taught insect biology, morphology, and behavior. In a court case relating to an aircrash, the cause was claimed to be due to the nest of a leaf-cutter bee Ashmeadiella (Megachilidae). Eickwort provided evidence during the hearing that demonstrated that the nest was built in the fuel-line of the aircraft long after the crash. Eickwort died in a car accident while in Jamaica. A genus of fossil halictids Eickwortapis is named in his honour.
