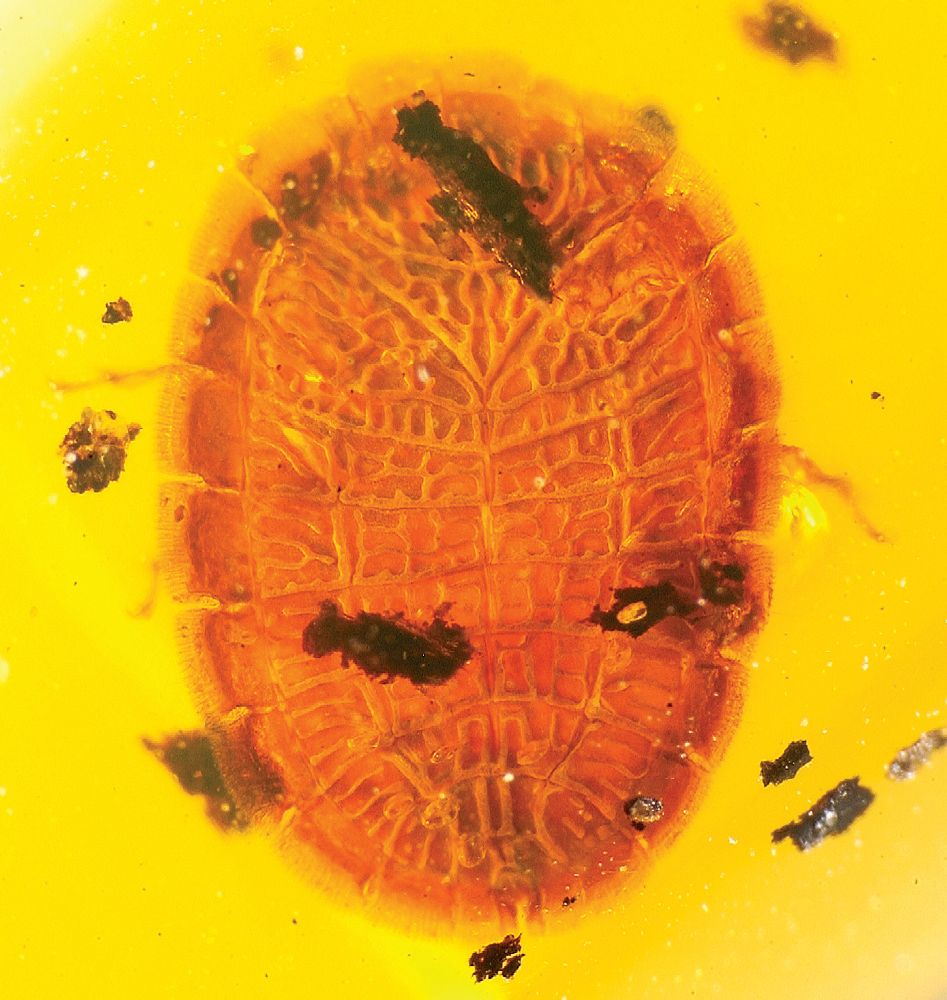
- Termitaradus mitnicki female in Dominican amber

Scientific classification
- Kingdom: Animalia
- Phylum: Arthropoda
- Clade: Pancrustacea
- Class: Insecta
- Order: Hemiptera
- Suborder: Heteroptera
- Superfamily: Aradoidea
- Family: Termitaphididae; Myers, 1924

Genera
- Termitaphis; Termitaradus

= Termitaphididae =

Family of true bugs

Termitaphididae, occasionally called termite bugs, is a small tropicopolitan family of true bugs placed in the superfamily Aradoidea. Typically members of Termitaphididae are small, being an average of 2 millimetres (0.079 in)-4 millimetres (0.16 in), and flattened with laminae extending out from each body segment giving a round scale like appearance. Currently the family contains two genera and twelve known species. Members of Termitaphididae are inquilines lodging in the nests of host species of termite families Termitidae and Rhinotermitidae. Though considered a separate family in Aradoidea it has been suggested by Drs David Grimaldi and Michael Engel in 2008 that Termataphididae may in fact be highly derived members of Aradidae. Of the thirteen known species one Termitaphis circumvallata belongs to the monotypic genus Termitaphis and four of the remaining eleven species in Termitaradus are extinct, having only been found in amber. The living species are found worldwide in the tropical regions of Central and South America, Africa, Asia, and Australia.
