= Stylotermes =

Scientific classification
- Kingdom: Animalia
- Phylum: Arthropoda
- Clade: Pancrustacea
- Class: Insecta
- Order: Blattodea
- Infraorder: Isoptera
- Family: Stylotermitidae
- Genus: Stylotermes; Holmgren, 1917

Type species
- Stylotermes fletcheri Holmgren, 1917

Genus of termites

Stylotermes is a genus of termites from Asia. It is the only living genus of the family Stylotermitidae. There are 45 described species.
