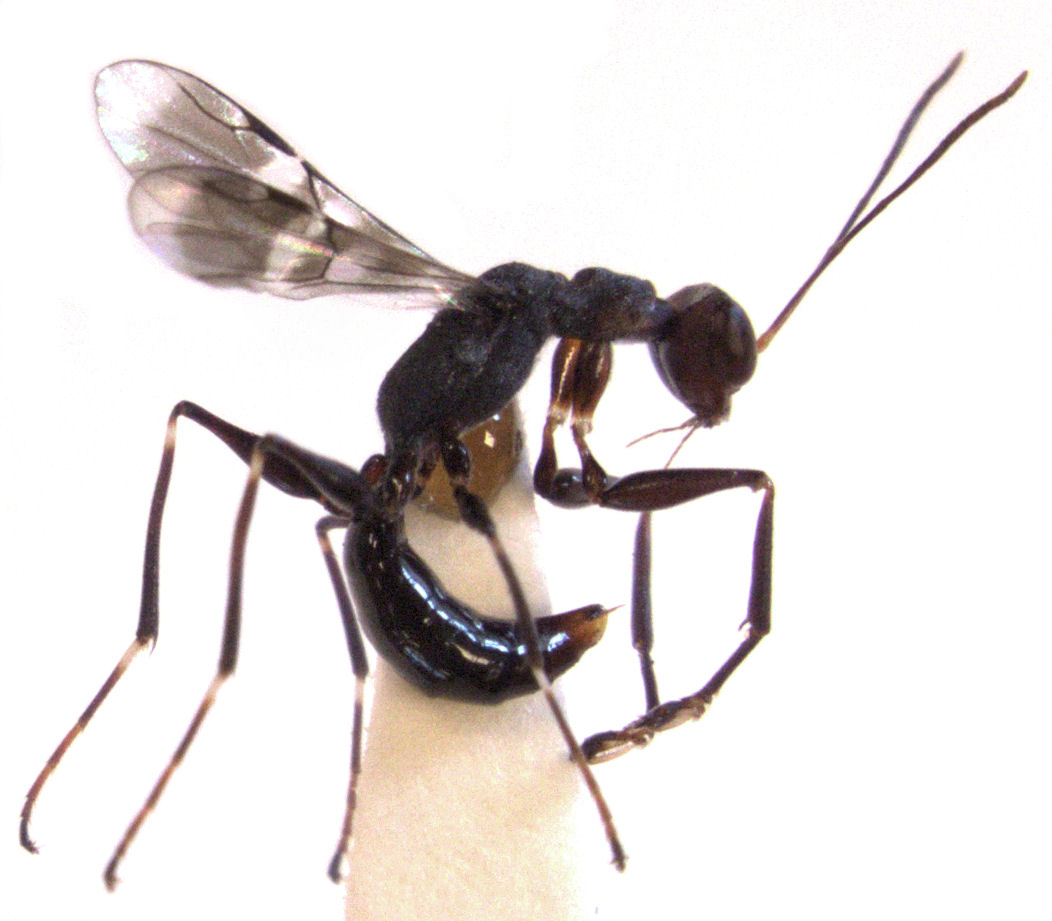
- Dryinus koebelei female

Scientific classification
- Kingdom: Animalia
- Phylum: Arthropoda
- Class: Insecta
- Order: Hymenoptera
- Family: Dryinidae
- Subfamily: Dryininae
- Genus: Dryinus; Latreille, 1804

Type species
- Dryinus collaris (Linnaeus, 1767)

= Dryinus =

Dryinus Temporal range: Cenomanian–Present

Genus of wasps

Dryinus is a cosmopolitan genus of dryinid parasitic wasp. Over 242 species have been described worldwide. Numerous fossil species have been described from the Baltic, Dominican and Burmese ambers.
