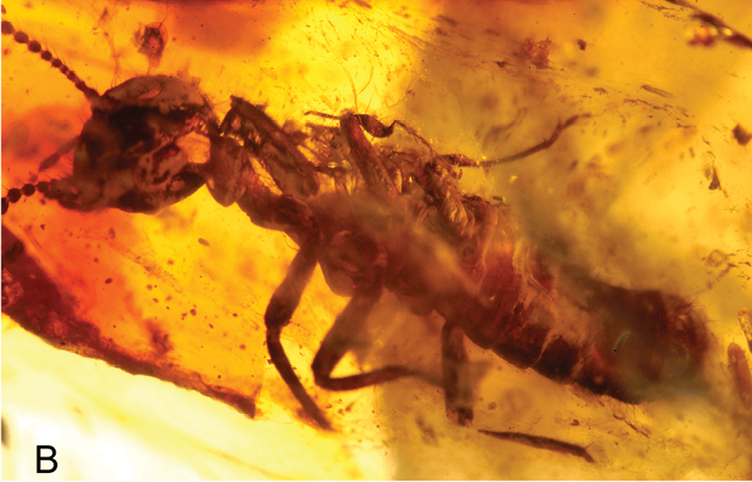
- † Prostylotermes kamboja

Scientific classification
- Domain: Eukaryota
- Kingdom: Animalia
- Phylum: Arthropoda
- Class: Insecta
- Order: Blattodea
- Infraorder: Isoptera
- Parvorder: Euisoptera
- Nanorder: Neoisoptera
- Family: Stylotermitidae; Holmgren & Holmgren, 1917

= Stylotermitidae =

Family of termites

Stylotermitidae is a family of termites in the order Blattodea. There are two extinct and one extant genera in Stylotermitidae, with more than 50 described species.

== Genera ==
These three genera belong to the family Stylotermitidae:

- Stylotermes Holmgren, 1917
- † Parastylotermes Snyder & Emerson, 1949
- † Prostylotermes Engel & Grimaldi, 2011
