= George Poinar Jr. =

American entomologist and writer (born 1936)

George O. Poinar Jr.
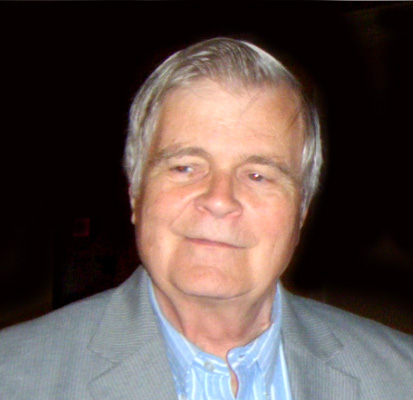
- Born: April 25, 1936 (age 90); Washington, United States
- Education: Cornell University
- Scientific career
- Fields: entomologist
- Workplaces: University of California, Berkeley Oregon State University

George O. Poinar Jr. (born April 25, 1936) is an American entomologist and writer. He is known for popularizing the idea of extracting DNA from insects fossilized in amber, an idea which received widespread attention when adapted by Michael Crichton for the book and movie Jurassic Park.

Poinar earned a BS and MS at Cornell University, and remained there for his doctoral studies, receiving a PhD in biology in 1962. He spent many of his years of research at University of California, Berkeley in the Department of Entomology, Division of Insect Pathology. There, and during travels around the globe, he performed research on the axenic culture of nematodes, nematode parasites of insects and the fossil records of insects and nematodes in amber.

In 1992 a team consisting of Poinar, his wife entomologist Roberta Poinar, his son Hendrik, and Dr. Raúl J. Cano of California Polytechnic State University claimed to have successfully extracted insect DNA from a Lebanese weevil in amber that was 125 million years old, collected by Raif Milki in Lebanon. More recent studies of ancient DNA cast doubt on the DNA results, but not on the authenticity of the amber samples.

In 1995, George and Roberta Poinar, a fellow researcher from Berkeley, moved to Oregon, where they opened the Amber Institute. Upon his move to Oregon he received a courtesy appointment to the Department of Entomology of Oregon State University.

In 2016, Poinar announced the discovery of a new plant species that is a 45-million-year-old relative of coffee he found in amber. Named Strychnos electri, after the Greek word for amber (electron), the flowers represent the first-ever fossils of an asterid.

In 2017, Poinar published a paper describing a fossilized flower and its tentative pollinator. The paper describes a flower of an ancestral milkweed plant, which was named Discoflorus neotropicus, and a termite carrying a pollinium, all covered in Dominican amber.

Poinar's son, Hendrik Poinar, is a genetics researcher in the Department of Anthropology at McMaster University.

== Publications ==
- Life in Amber (1992), a summary of the varied forms of insect and other life found in amber
- Amplification and sequencing of DNA from a 120-135-million-year-old weevil (1993)
- The Quest for Life in Amber (1994)
- The Amber Forest: A Reconstruction of a Vanished World (1999), co-authored with Roberta Poinar
- Lebanese Amber: The Oldest Insect Ecosystem in Fossilized Resin, co-authored with Raif Milki who collected the amber samples in Lebanon (2001)

== See also ==
- Category:Taxa named by George Poinar Jr.
