= ZooKeys =

- Discipline: Taxonomy; Zoology; Ecology; Paleontology; Genomics; Behavioral Science
- Language: English
- Edited by: Torsten Dikow

Publication details
- History: 2008–present
- Publisher: Pensoft Publishers
- Frequency: Continuous
- Open access: Yes
- License: CC BY 4.0
- Impact factor: 1.5 (2025)

Standard abbreviations
- ISO 4: ZooKeys

Indexing
- ISSN: 1313-2989 (print); 1313-2970 (web)
- OCLC no.: 248547717

Links
- Journal homepage

ZooKeys is a peer-reviewed open access scientific journal covering zoological taxonomy, phylogeny, and biogeography. It was established in 2008 and the founding editor-in-chief was Terry Erwin (Smithsonian Institution) until his death in 2020. In December 2023, Torsten Dikow was appointed the new editor-in-chief. It is published by Pensoft Publishers.

ZooKeys provides all new taxa to the Encyclopedia of Life on the day of publication.

== Abstracting and indexing ==
The articles published in the journal are indexed across a significant number of repositories. The content of the journal is archived in PubMed Central, CLOCKSS, Zenodo, Portico, Europe PMC, and Zendy, and indexed by a large number of industry leading indexers. The full list of indexers can be found on the journal homepage. The 2025 Scopus CiteScore for ZooKeys is 2.5.

ZooKeys allows authors to publish preprints of their manuscripts on ARPHA Preprints or other preprint servers.

== Reviewing policy ==
Scientific articles submitted for publishing in journal are subjected to a single-blind review process. In this review process, the author submitting their research article does not know the identities of their reviewers, although the reviewers may choose to if so desired. Two independent experts review each article, and a final publishing decision is made by the editor-in-chief.

== Use of AI policy ==
The platform rule on AI tools like ChatGPT is that the author must disclose how the tool was used.
