= David Grimaldi (entomologist) =

American paleontologist

David A. Grimaldi
- Born: September 22, 1957 (age 68); U.S.
- Occupation(s): Entomologist, Paleontologist

David A. Grimaldi (born September 22, 1957) is an entomologist and Curator of Invertebrate Zoology at the American Museum of Natural History in New York. He received his graduate training at Cornell University, where he earned his doctorate in Entomology in 1986. Grimaldi is an authority in many fields of insect systematics, paleontology, and evolutionary biology.

Grimaldi is also an adjunct professor at Cornell University, Columbia University, and the City University of New York.

Aside from numerous papers in scientific journals, Grimaldi is author of Amber: Window to the Past, and of Evolution of the Insects (2005) with co-author Michael S. Engel.

== Honors and awards ==
Some of Grimaldi's scientific honors include:

- Thomas Say Award, Entomological Society of America, 2007

== Eponymy ==
The following is a selection of taxa that have been named for Grimaldi:

- Afrarchaea grimaldii Penney (a fossil archaeid spider in Burmese amber)
- Ambradolon grimaldii Metz (a fossil therevid fly in Dominican amber)
- Burmadactylus grimaldii Heads (a fossil pygmy mole cricket in Burmese amber)
- Ctenoplectrella grimaldii Engel (a fossil bee in Baltic amber)
- Cubanoptila grimaldii Wichard (a fossil caddisfly in Dominican amber)
- Euliphora grimaldii Arillo & Mostovski (a fossil phorid fly in Spanish amber)
- Glabellula grimaldii Evenhuis (a fossil Mythicomyiidae in Dominican amber)
- Glyptotermes grimaldii Engel & Krishna (a fossil drywood termite in Dominican amber)
- Grimaldinia Popov & Heiss (a genus of fossil leptosaldine shore bugs in Burmese amber)
- Halitheres grimaldii Giribet & Dunlop (a fossil harvestman in Burmese amber)
- Palaeoburmesebuthus grimaldii Lourenço (a fossil scorpion in Burmese amber)
- Phyloblatta grimaldii Vršanský (a fossil roach from the Triassic of Virginia)
- Plectromerus grimaldii Nearns & Branham (a fossil long-horn beetle in Dominican amber)

== Works ==
- Grimaldi, D. (1996). Amber: Window to the Past. Abrams. ISBN 0-8109-2652-0.
- Grimaldi, D.; Engel, M.S. (2005). Evolution of the Insects. Cambridge University Press. ISBN 0-521-82149-5.
