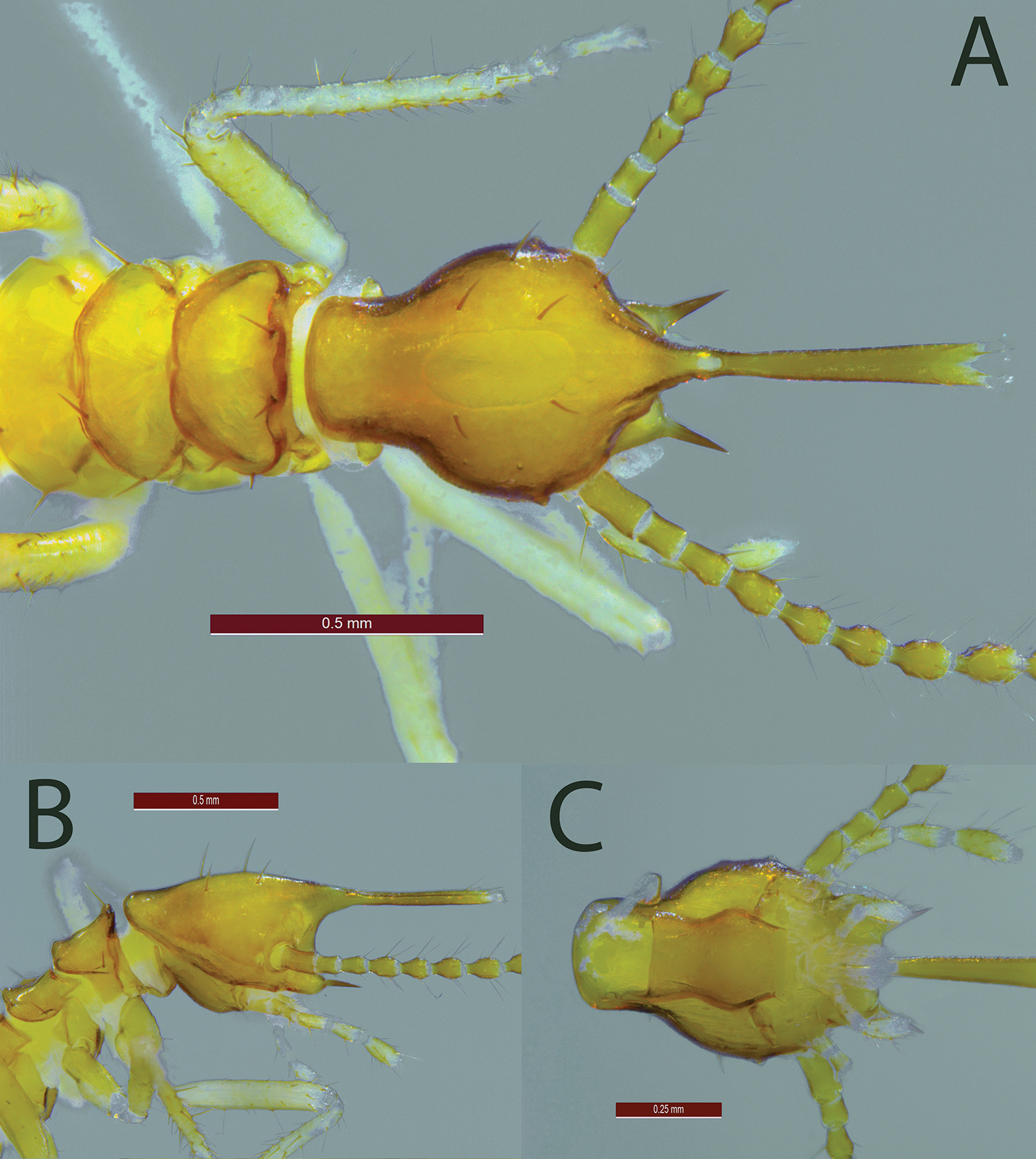
- Acorhinotermes claritae

Scientific classification
- Kingdom: Animalia
- Phylum: Arthropoda
- Clade: Pancrustacea
- Class: Insecta
- Order: Blattodea
- Infraorder: Isoptera
- Nanorder: Neoisoptera
- Family: Rhinotermitidae; Froggatt, 1897

Type genus
- Rhinotermes Hagen, 1858

Genera
- See text

= Rhinotermitidae =

Family of termites

Rhinotermitidae sensu novo are a family of Neoisopteran termites formerly represented by taxa known as Subterranean termites (Heterotermitidae, Psammotermitidae, etc...) but is now only represented by genera within the historical subfamily Rhinotermitinae. The soldiers of Rhinotermitidae notably possess a labral brush, a highly modified projection of the labrum which channels the fontanellar fluid onto a hairy tip, smearing the fluid onto threats. The Rhinotermitidae have a wide distribution, being found from the Neotropics to the Indomalayan, Afrotropical, Australasian, and Palearctic (Sino-Japanese) realms.

== Genera ==
- Acorhinotermes
- Dolichorhinotermes
- Macrorhinotermes
- Parrhinotermes
- Rhinotermes
- Schedorhinotermes
- †Zophotermes
- †Lukotermes
