= Michael S. Engel =

American paleontologist and entomologist

- Born: September 24, 1971 (age 55); Creve Coeur, Missouri, U.S.
- Education: Cornell University (Ph.D, 1998); University of Kansas (B.Sc., 1993); University of Kansas (B.A., 1993)
- Occupations: Paleontologist, Entomologist
- Known for: Insect evolutionary biology and classification
- Spouse: Kellie Kristen Magill (m. 2009)
- Parent(s): Alger Gayle Engel, Donna Gail Engel (née Pratt)
- Awards: Guggenheim Fellow (2006); Charles Schuchert Award (2008); Bicentenary Medal (2009); Nautilus Book Award (2019)
- Scientific career
- Workplaces: American Museum of Natural History (1998–present); University of Kansas (2000–2023)
- Doctoral advisor: James K. Liebherr (Cornell University)
- Other academic advisors: George C. Eickwort, Thomas D. Seeley, Richard G. Harrison, Charles D. Michener
- Author abbrev. (botany): M.S.Engel
- Author abbrev. (zoology): Engel

Michael S. Engel, FLS, FRES (born September 24, 1971) is an American paleontologist and entomologist, notable for contributions to insect evolutionary biology and classification. In connection with his studies he has undertaken field expeditions in Central Asia, Asia Minor, the Levant, Arabia, eastern Africa, the high Arctic, and South and North America, and has published more than 925 papers in scientific journals. Some of Engel's research images were included in exhibitions on the aesthetic value of scientific imagery.

== Career ==
Michael Engel received a B.Sc. in physiology and cell biology and a B.A. in chemistry from the University of Kansas in 1993, and a Ph.D. in entomology from Cornell University in 1998. He was a research scientist at the American Museum of Natural History from 1998 to 2000, and then returned to the University of Kansas as assistant professor in the Department of Entomology, assistant professor in the Department of Ecology and Evolutionary Biology, and assistant curator in the Natural History Museum's Division of Entomology. He was promoted to full professor and senior curator in 2008, and University Distinguished Professor in 2018. In 2006–2007 Engel resumed regular activity in the American Museum of Natural History while a Guggenheim Fellow, completing work on the geological history of termites and their influence on carbon recycling in paleoenvironments. This period also permitted significant work on the comprehensive work, Treatise on the Termites of the World.

== Awards and distinctions ==
In 2008 he received the Charles Schuchert Award of the Paleontological Society and subsequently the Bicentenary Medal of the Linnean Society of London (2009) for his contributions to the fields of systematic entomology and paleontology. In Spring 2014 he was awarded the Scholarly Achievement Award of the University of Kansas for his contributions to the evolutionary and developmental origins of insect flight; and in 2015 the International Cooperation Award from the Chinese Academy of Sciences. In 2017, Engel was elected as a Fellow of the Entomological Society of America and received the society's Thomas Say Award. In Spring 2019, Innumerable Insects won a Silver Award in the Nautilus Book Award. In October 2022, Engel was elected as a Fellow of AAAS.

The standard author abbreviation M.S.Engel is used to indicate this person as the author when citing a paleobotanical name.

== Personal life ==
Engel married Kellie K. Magill on April 25, 2009, in a ceremony performed by Engel's father.
