= Agulla mineralensis =

Agulla mineralensis Temporal range: Late Barstovian 14.5–14 Ma

Scientific classification
- Domain: Eukaryota
- Kingdom: Animalia
- Phylum: Arthropoda
- Class: Insecta
- Order: Raphidioptera
- Family: Raphidiidae
- Genus: Agulla
- Species: †A. mineralensis

Binomial name
- †Agulla mineralensis Engel, 2011

Extinct species of insect

Agulla mineralensis is an extinct species of snakefly in the raphidiid genus Agulla. The species is solely known from the Middle Miocene, late Bartovian stage, Pacific Union Site in the Stewart Valley Group, Mineral County, Nevada.

== History and classification ==
Agulla mineralensis is known only from one fossil, the holotype, specimen number 539. The specimen is composed of a complete specimen of an isolated hind-wing which is preserved as a compression fossil in sedimentary paper shale. The fossil was recovered from outcrops of the Stewart Valley group shales at the Pacific Union site, BLM locality #26-30-09-335, in Mineral County, Nevada, USA. A. mineralensis was first studied by Michael S. Engel of the University of Kansas, Lawrence, Kansas, USA. His 2009 type description of the new species was published in the journal Transactions of the Kansas Academy of Science. Engel coined the specific epithet mineralensis in honor of Mineral County, where the species was found. At the time of the species description, Agulla mineralensis was the only member of the order Raphidioptera to be found in Neogene aged fossil deposits in North America.

== Description ==
The lone specimen of Agulla mineralensis is approximately 10.9 millimetres (0.43 in) in length and a maximum of 3.8 millimetres (0.15 in) in width. The presence of distinct M and Cu veins in the very basal section of the wing denotes the wing is a hind-wing. The wing is apparently hyaline in coloration with a slight darkening of the pterostigma area. The subcostal space is about half the width of the preserved section of the costal space. The notably long M vein prior to separation into MP and MA veins in A. mineralensis distinguishes the species from other Tertiary raphidiids with described hind-wings. While the elongated pterostigma is similar to the extinct species of Florissantoraphidia, F. mortua and F. funerata, the M vein length and less branching of the veins near the wing tip separate them from A. mineralensis.
