= Puncha =

Puncha may refer to:

- Puncha (community development block), an administrative division in Purulia Sadar East, West Bengal, India
- Puncha, Purulia, a village, with a police station, in Purulia district, West Bengal, India.
- Puncha (snakefly), a genus of snakeflies in the family Raphidiidae
- Puncha ratzeburgi, a species of snakeflies in the family Raphidiidae

== See also ==
- Punacha
