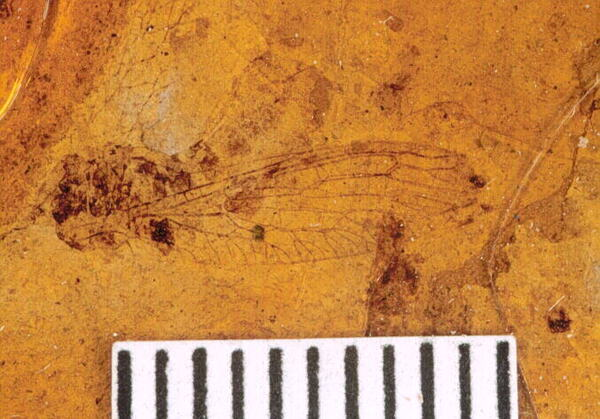
- F. mortua holotype

Scientific classification
- Domain: Eukaryota
- Kingdom: Animalia
- Phylum: Arthropoda
- Class: Insecta
- Order: Raphidioptera
- Family: Raphidiidae
- Genus: †Florissantoraphidia; Makarkin & Archibald, 2014

Species
- F. funerata (Engel, 2003); F. mortua (Rohwer, 1909)

= Florissantoraphidia =

Florissantoraphidia Temporal range: Priabonian

Extinct genus of insects

Florissantoraphidia is an extinct genus of snakefly in the family Raphidiidae containing two described species Florissantoraphidia funerata and Florissantoraphidia mortua. Both species were originally placed in the living raphidiid genus Raphidia, as Raphidia funerata and Raphidia mortua respectively. before being redescribed and transferred to the newly erected genus in 2014.

== Range ==
Both Florissantoraphidia funerata and F. mortua are only known from the Florissant Formation, which has produced a series of other snakefly species in three different families. The extinct family Baissopteridae is represented by the species Dictyoraphidia veterana, while Raphidiidae is present as species of the extinct genera Archiraphidia and Megaraphidia, and Inocelliidae is represented by Fibla exusta. Out of the described snakefly specimens from the Florissant Formation, the F. funerata holotype is the most complete.

== Description ==
=== Florissantoraphidia funerata ===
Preserved as a compression fossil, the F. funerata female individual is fossilized in a resting position giving a side view to the body and wings. Including the ovipositor, F. funerata is 16.5 millimetres (0.65 in) and has a forewing length of 10 millimetres (0.39 in). Of the known snakefly species, F. funerata is closest in appearance to the extinct F. mortua. The two cogeneric species can be separated by several features of the forewing, including a lack of terminal forks in veins along the posterior margin of the wing in F. funerata, and the radial cell bordering the pterostigma narrowing at the base in F. mortua. F. funerata was originally assigned to the genus Raphidia, but this assignment was made with hesitation by Dr. Engel as the characteristics used to separate living genera, the reproductive structures, are not preserved in most fossils and very rarely in compression fossils.

The name F. funerata is derived from the Latin funeratus meaning to "bury" or "intern". The species is known from a single female specimen, the holotype, deposited in the Department of Palaeontology at the Natural History Museum in London as specimen number "In. 26922". Though they did not study the specimen, Aspöck, Aspöck and Rausch in the 1991 work Die Raphidiopteren der Erde noted and figured the specimen as an "unidentified raphidiid". Engel first studied and described the species after finding the specimen in the Department of Palaeontology collections. and published his type description in the journal Transactions of the Kansas Academy of Science (Volume 106) in 2003. Engel (2003) considered it possible the Florissant Formation species were members of one of the two nearctic genera Alena or Agulla. In a 2014 study Vladimir N. Makarkin and S. Bruce Archibald removed the species F. mortua and F. funerata from Raphidia, and transferred them to the new genus Florissantoraphidia.
