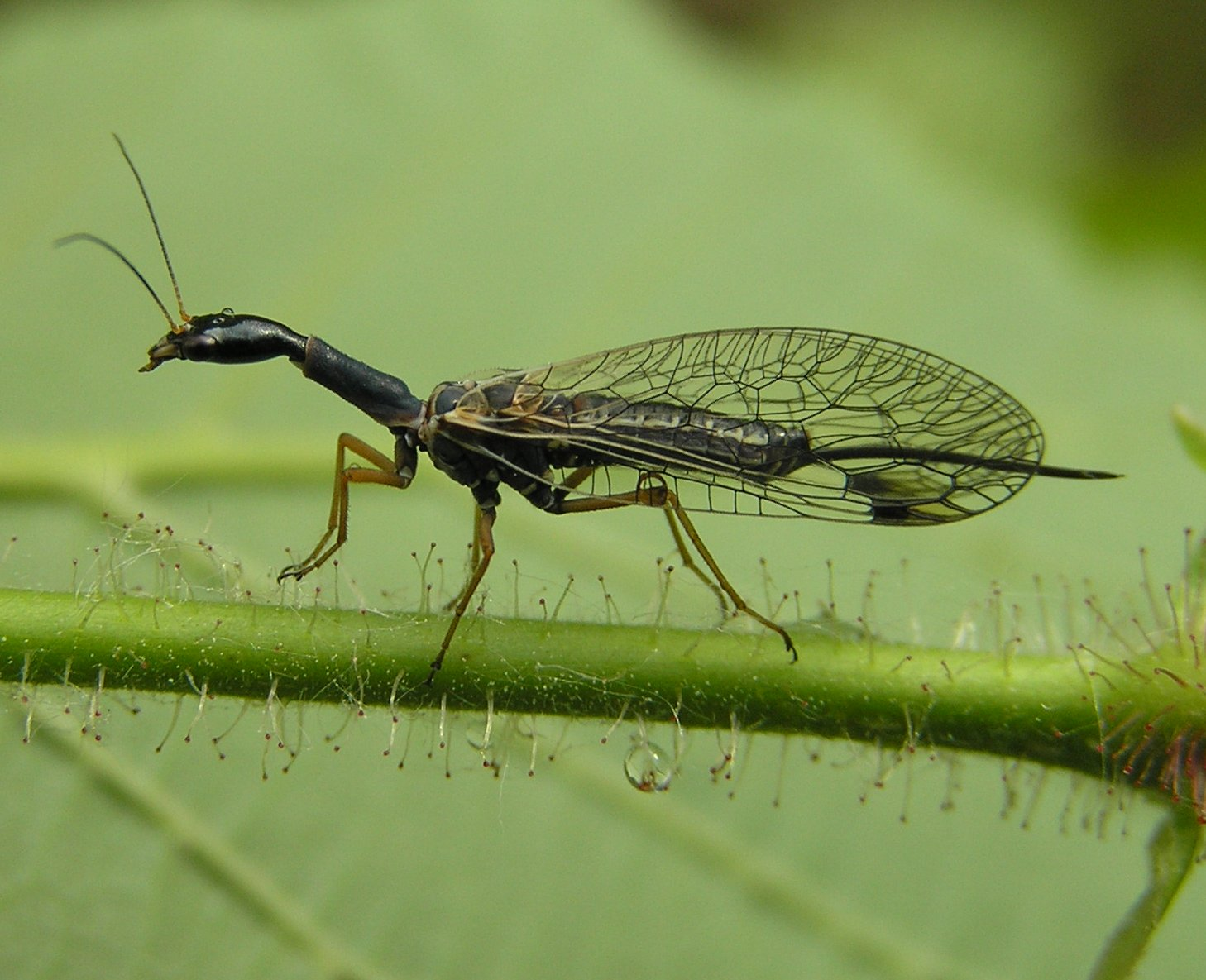
- On common hazel, near Brok, Poland

Scientific classification
- Kingdom: Animalia
- Phylum: Arthropoda
- Clade: Pancrustacea
- Class: Insecta
- Order: Raphidioptera
- Family: Raphidiidae
- Genus: Dichrostigma
- Species: D. flavipes

Binomial name
- Dichrostigma flavipes (Stein, 1863)

Synonyms
- Dichrostigma affine (Schneider, 1843); Raphidia dichroma Steinmann, 1964; Raphidia durmitorica Steinmann, 1964; Raphidia flavipes (Stein, 1863); Raphidia maculicaput Steinmann, 1964; Raphidia monotona Steinmann, 1964; Raphidia sinica Steinmann, 1964; Rhaphidia affinis Schneider, 1843; Rhaphidia flavipes Stein, 1863; Subilla balesdenti Poivre, 1991; Subilla sulfuricosta Steinmann, 1963

= Dichrostigma flavipes =

Species of insect

Dichrostigma flavipes is a species of snakefly in the family Raphidiidae. It is found in Western Europe. This species can be distinguished by its two-colored pterostigma that transitions from brown to yellow away from the body. The larvae of this species exclusively live in the soil around the roots of trees and bushes, where the larvae take two years to develop into adults. The adults of this species are euryoecious, meaning they are able to live in various habitats and conditions. However, they prefer more dry and hot places. These adult specimens primarily live at the edge of forests.
