= Agulla nixa =

Scientific classification
- Domain: Eukaryota
- Kingdom: Animalia
- Phylum: Arthropoda
- Class: Insecta
- Order: Raphidioptera
- Family: Raphidiidae
- Genus: Agulla
- Species: A. nixa

Binomial name
- Agulla nixa

Species of insect

Agulla nixa is a species of snakefly that can be found in wooded areas in Texas and Mexico. Its common name is Texan snakefly. The species is 15–22 mm long and feeds on smaller insects. The female inserts its eggs in bark crevices which is also where the larvae eat.
