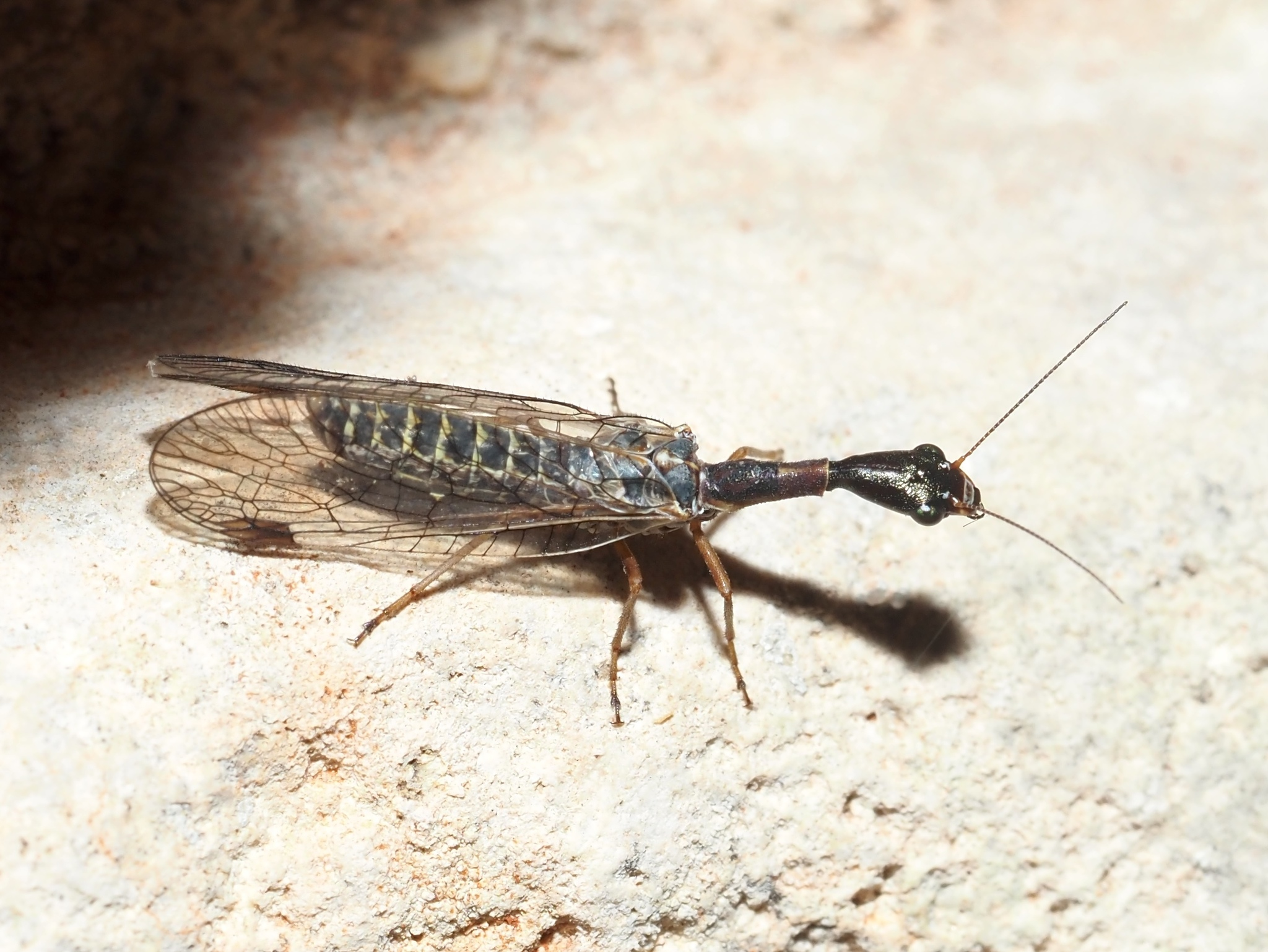

Scientific classification
- Domain: Eukaryota
- Kingdom: Animalia
- Phylum: Arthropoda
- Class: Insecta
- Order: Raphidioptera
- Family: Raphidiidae
- Genus: Agulla
- Species: A. bicolor

Binomial name
- Agulla bicolor (Albarda, 1891)

= Agulla bicolor =

Species of insect

Agulla bicolor is a species of snakefly in the family Raphidiidae. It is found in North America.
