= Budhpur, Purulia =

Budhpur
- Village
- Location in West Bengal, India Budhpur (India)
- Coordinates: 23.1096°N 86.6613°E
- Country: India
- State: West Bengal
- District: Purulia

Population (2011)
  - Total: 496

Languages
  - Official: Bengali, English
- Time zone: UTC+5:30 (IST)
- PIN: 723151
- Telephone/STD code: 03253
- Lok Sabha constituency: Purulia
- Vidhan Sabha constituency: Manbazar
- Website: purulia.gov.in

Budhpur is a village in the Manbazar I CD block in the Manbazar subdivision of the Purulia district in the state of West Bengal, India.

== Geography ==
=== Location ===
Budhpur is located at 23.1096°N 86.6613°E.

Budhpur is 6 km north of Manbazar and 11 km south of Pakbirra. It is on the north bank of the Kangsabati.

=== Area overview ===
Purulia district forms the lowest step of the Chota Nagpur Plateau. The general scenario is undulating land with scattered hills. Manbazar subdivision, shown in the map alongside, is located in the eastern part of the district. It is an overwhelmingly rural subdivision with 96.32% of the population living in the rural areas and 3.68% living in the urban areas. There are 3 census towns in the subdivision. The map shows the Kangsabati Project Reservoir. The Mukutmanipur Dam is in Bankura district but the upper portion of the reservoir is in Manbazar subdivision. The remnants of old temples and deities are found in the subdivision also, as in other parts of the district. The subdivision has a very high proportion of Scheduled Castes and Scheduled Tribes. Bandwan CD block has 51.86% ST population, Manbazar II CD block has 48.97% ST population. Manbazar I CD block has 22.03% ST and 22.44% SC. Puncha CD block has 24.74% ST and 14.54 SC. Writing in 1911, H. Coupland, ICS, speaks of the aboriginal races largely predominating in the old Manbhum district. He particularly mentions the Kurmis, Santhals, Bhumij and Bauri.

== Demographics ==
According to the 2011 Census of India, Budhpur had a total population of 496, of which 247 (50%) were males and 249 (50%) were females. There were 77 persons in the age range of 0–6 years. The total number of literate persons in Budhpur was 259 (61.81% of the population over 6 years).

== Culture ==
There was a large Buddheswara Shiva temple, with an attached mandapa at Budhpur. There were four smaller shrines at the corners of the enclosure. The main temple has virtually fallen down and only one of the corner shrines is partly there. The place is now full of tumbled down blocks of stone. In J.D.Beglar's time (late 19th century), the tower of the main temple (possibly fallen down by then) was replaced by a brick-and-plaster work. In 1926, it was replaced by a rough stone tower having a curved entrance. From the fragments of the amalakas, chaityas, etc. in the rubble, it appears that all these temples were in the nagara style. The original Shivalingam appears to have disappeared. Some cult images have been found. Apart from the main temple and corner shrines in the enclosure, Beglar had seen five small shrines to the north-east of the main temple. Beglar dated the temples at Budhpur to have come up in the 12th/13th century.

== Gallery ==
Places in Manbazar subdivision in Purulia district
CT: census town, R: rural/ urban centre, H: historical/ religious centre
Owing to space constraints in the small map, the actual locations in a larger map may vary slightly
Note: The map alongside presents some of the notable locations in the subdivision. All places marked in the map are linked in the larger full screen map.
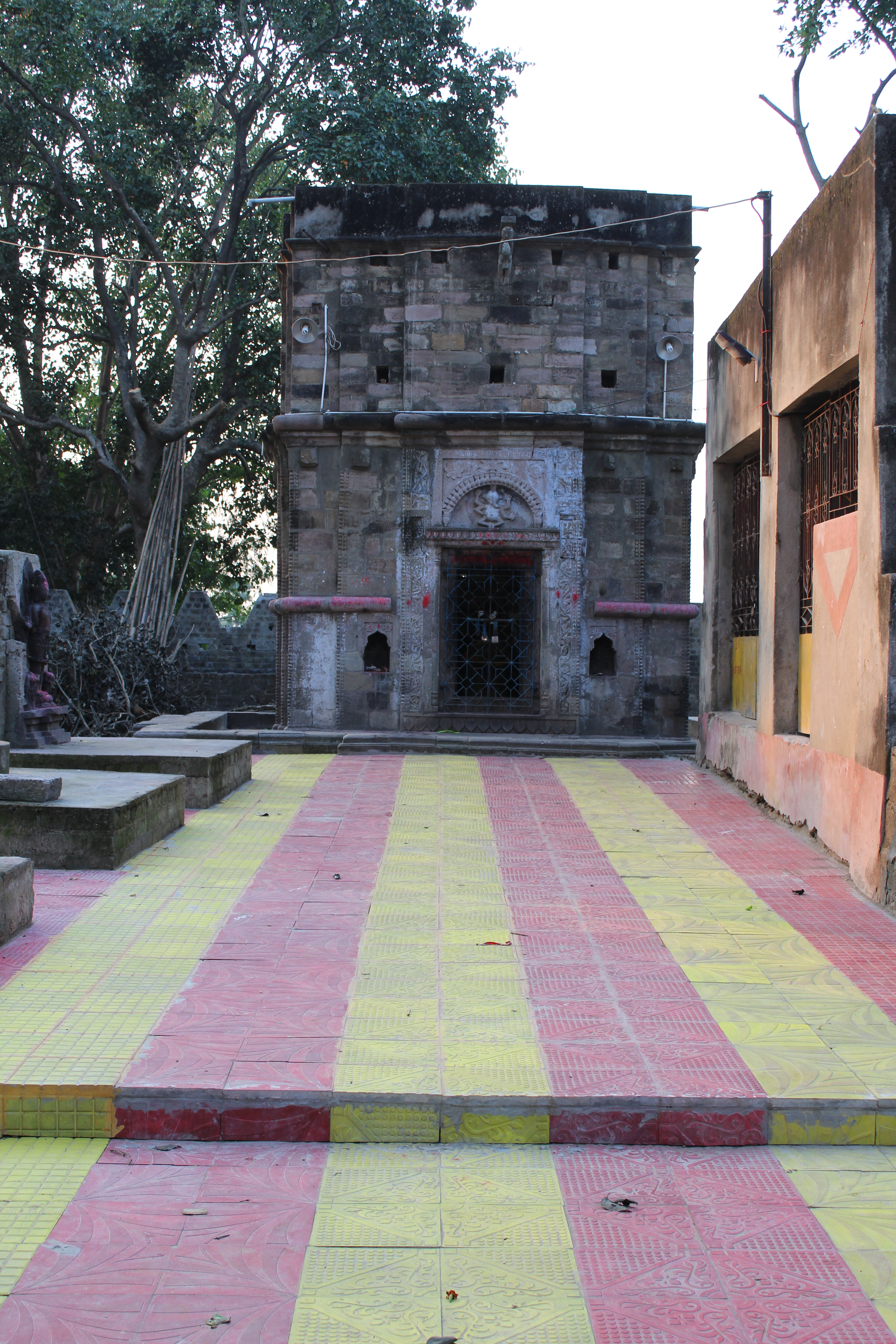
The Shiva temple as it stands now

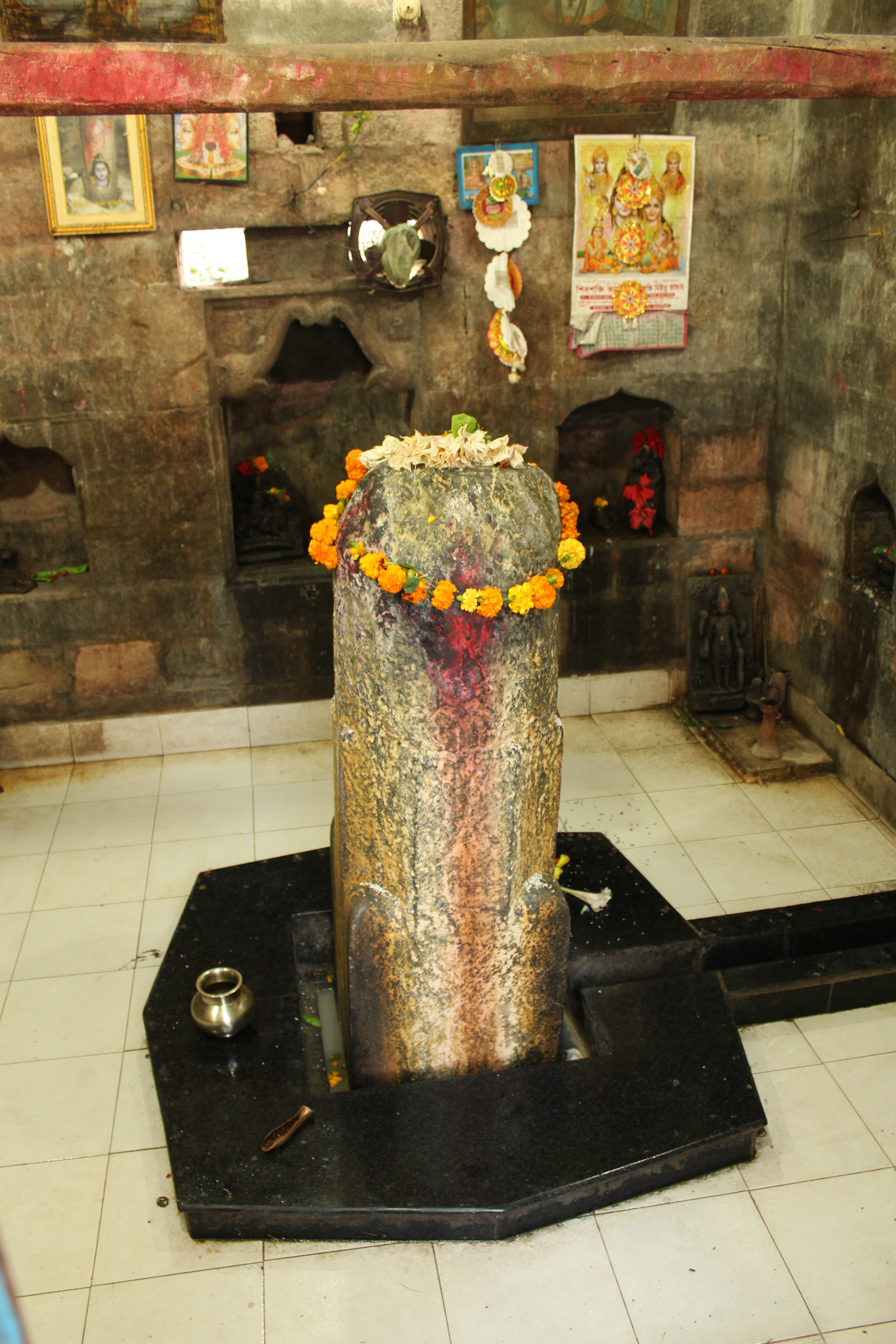
The Shivalingam now in the temple

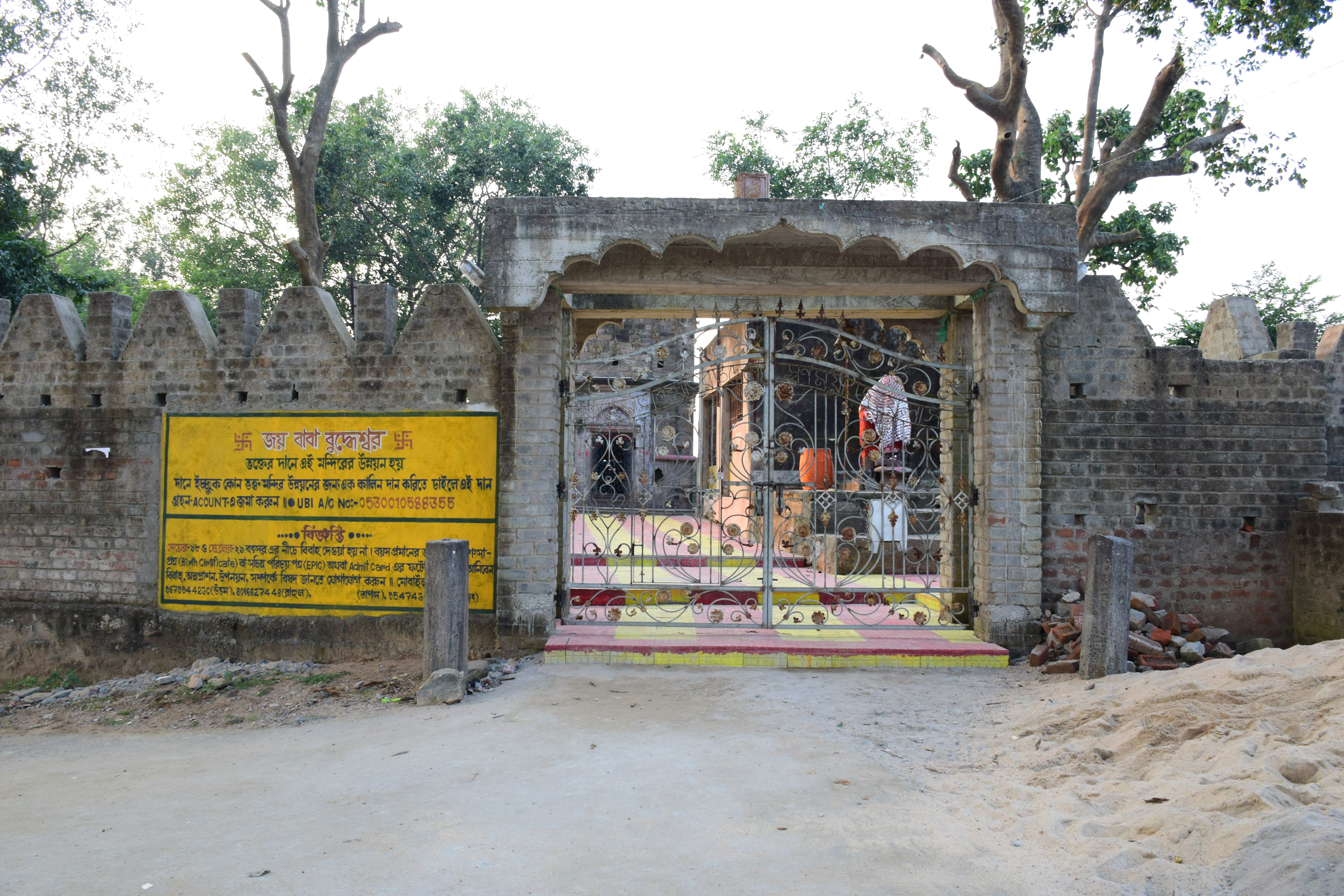
Temple gate
