= Mongoloraphidia =

Scientific classification
- Kingdom: Animalia
- Phylum: Arthropoda
- Clade: Pancrustacea
- Class: Insecta
- Order: Raphidioptera
- Family: Raphidiidae
- Genus: Mongoloraphidia; H. Aspöck & U. Aspöck 1968

Genus of insects

Mongoloraphidia is a genus of snakefly in the family Raphidiidae comprising 65 species distributed throughout Central and Eastern Asia. It is the most species-rich genus of the eastern Palearctic Raphidiidae and forms the ecological and evolutionary core of the region's snakefly fauna.

== Taxonomy and phylogeny ==
=== Geologic and evolutionary history ===
Mongoloraphidia is believed to have originated during the Late Cretaceous to Early Oligocene (160-30 million years ago), when the prehistoric epicontental Turgai Strait served as a biogegraphical barrier between Europe and Asia, divided at today's Ural region and western Siberia. This separated ancestral Raphidiidae, leading to independent evolution into an adapted Central and East Asian snakefly clade.

Further diversification of Mongoloraphidia can be attributed to the Late Miocene to Early Pliocene (~10-5 million years ago) in connection to uplift of Central Asian mountain systems like the Tien Shan, Pamir-Alai, and Altai ranges. These events created a complex array of montane and intermontane habitats the provided opportunities for ecological spread and barriers for dispersal. During the Late Miocene, Central Asia shifted from a subtropical biome to a drier continental climate. The rise of the Tien Shan and Pamir ranges intensified rain-shadow effects, directly leading to the desiccation of the Dzungarian and Tarim basins and the formation of the Karakum and Kyzylkum deserts. As these deserts expanded, once continuous forested corridors fragmented into isolated mountain biomes, islands that now harbor species of Mongoloraphidia. The oldest lineages, represented by subgenera like Kirgisoraphidia and Usbekoraphidia are likely to have diverged during this aridification event from a common ancestor with the European Raphidia genus.

The Pleistocene glacial-interglacial cycles (2.6 million years ago to 12 thousand years ago) further contributed to habitat fragmentation. Glaciers caused downslope shifts of vegetation zones with some loss of montane forests, while interglacial periods allowed for limited recolonization of the valleys. These alternating phases repeatedly isolated Snakefly populations in individual valleys, leading to allopatric speciation events. Weak flying capacities and substrate requirements for larvae meant that these populations maintained isolation even in periods of favorable climate. Mongoloraphidia species richness in the Talas, Fergana, and Alai ranges correspond to forests that survived these Pleistocene glacial cycles.

=== Phylogeny ===
- Raphidiidae
  - - Canada, Western USA
      Agulla sp.
  - - Southern USA, Mexico
      Alena sp.
    - Palearctic
      - Central Asia, Eastern Asia
        Mongoloraphidia sp.
      - Western Palearctic
        - Phaeostigma Clade
        - Puncha Clade
        - Western Mediterranean
          Ohmella Clade

Molecular phylogenetic analysis shows that Mongoloraphidia is sister to European snakeflies.

=== Taxonomic history ===
The genus Mongoloraphidia was established by Austrian entomologists Horst Aspöck and Ulrike Aspöck to accommodate a diverse assemblage of Central and East Asian Raphidiidae that could not be placed within the genus Raphidia that makes up the majority of species native to Europe. Subsequent revisions by the Aspöcks divided Mongoloraphidia into several subgenera, each corresponding to a geographically and morphologically coherent and endemic lineage. All of which that are currently known are listed at the bottom of the page.

== Morphology and ecology ==
=== Larval ===
Larvae of Mongoloraphidia are elongate predators with prognathous heads and well-developed legs. The head capsule is sclerotized, usually dark brown with prominent mandibles. They typically prey on insect larvae, eggs, spiders, aphids, mites, and other small arthropods. Body coloration is typically a reflection of the substrate in which it resides, pale beige in soil-dwelling species (known as terricolous), dark in bark dwelling species (known as corticolous species). Corticolous larvae are dorsoventrally flattened, with lateral body setae and smooth tergites; Terricolous larvae are cylindrical, with enlarged terminal segments bearing digging setae or spines. Larval development typically spans 8-10 instars over a two-to-three-year period, with diapause during cold or dry seasons.

=== Adult ===
Adults of Mongoloraphidia have the same slender, elongated body typical of members of Raphidiidae, with narrow wings and an extended prothorax. They are considered medium-sized snakeflies (forewing length 10-17mm), often with pale brown or yellowish coloration that acts as camouflage with surrounding bark and soil. The pigmentation of their body is strongly adaptive to its local environment, with species from arid zones such as M. kirgisica and M. nomadobia showing lighter brown or orange tones compared to montane forest species like M. monstruosa, M. sejde, that are considerably darker.

The head is orthognathous, containing large compound eyes and long filiform antennae of 40-60 segments. Mandibles are sharp, adapted for predation on small arthropods. Ocelli are small or absent in high-elevation species, adapted to shaded mountainside forests. Legs are long and slender with strong curved claws. In corticolous species, claws are more prominent for gripping bark, while terricolous species have tibiae that are covered with dense setae and are flattened for walking along loose soil and litter. Adults frequently crawl, rather than fly, typically found resting on tree trunks or stones within shaded valleys.

Male genitalia serve as the primary diagnostic tool and key within Mongoloraphidia.This consists of having an elongated and sclerotized ectoproct along with identifiable variation with the gonarcus, hypandrium internum, and hypovalva. Females possess a long, sabre-like ovipositor that often exceeds the length of the abdomen. This ovipositor differs between corticolous and terricolous species. Corticolous species (M. monstruosa, M. sejde) have sharply pointed, narrow ovipositors for insertion into bark, whereas terricolous species (M. kirgisica, M. nomadobia) have broader, blunter ovipositors used to deposit eggs in soil.

Mongoloraphidia wings show a reduction and simplification of venation compared to the wings of western Palearctic genera. This reduced venation is correlated with the genus's weaker flight capacity that has been adapted to sheltered mountainside habitats and dense vegetation rather than open-flight conditions. Crossveins between R and M are quite sparse, and the pterostigma is elongated and light in color. The reduced flight musculature, cryptic coloration, and ovipositor diversity are indicative of a sedentary, substrate-bound life history, optimized for mountain systems.

=== Diagnosis ===
Mongoloraphidia is distinguished from other Palearctic genera by its combination of elongate body, narrow hyaline wings with reduced venation, and prolonged, cylindrical prothorax. The male hypovalva is highly variable and frequently lacks a median suture, differing from that of european Raphidia and Xanthostigma, the other genus that can be found in Asia.

== Habitat and distribution ==
Mongoloraphidia are exclusively confined to the eastern palearctic biogeographical region, which contains land east of the Ural Mountains and north of South and Southeast Asia. Their distribution is not continuous. Rather, it is fragmented into many isolated populations that are confined to montane (mountainside) forest and steppe islands, which are separated by arid basins and deserts like the Kyzylkum, Karakum, and Taklamakan. Within this vast geographical range, there are two primary regions of diversity.

The Central Asiatic Mountain Region encompasses the Tien Shan, Pamir-Alay, Fergana Altai, and Hisar mountain ranges. This is the primary center for genus speciation. In Kyrgyzstan, Uzbekistan, and Tajikistan, nearly 30 Mongoloraphidia species have been described, many restricted to single mountain slopes or valleys. Diversity of the species has been shown to peak at elevations between 1,500 and 2,500 meters, primarily in juniper woodlands and open mountainside steppes. The Fergana Valley, Alai Range, and Talas Basin are considered zones of sympatry, in which up to five species occur together and are ecologically separated through habitat partitioning and staggered flight times.

The East Asiatic Region includes Japan, Taiwan, and regions of northern and central China. Unlike the highly speciated central Asian region, this eastern distribution is represented by significantly fewer relict lineages. These taxa are allopatric and do not display overlap in range, with each native to specific mountain regions and forests.

Mongoloraphidia displays a significant amount of endemism. More than 80% of described species are only known from single localities or small mountain systens. Oftentimes, these areas are no larger than a few tens of kilometers. M. nurgiza, for example, is believed to be confined to a single juniper valley in eastern Kyrgyzstan.

== Conservation ==
The conservation status of Mongoloraphidia remains unknown and has not been assessed by organizations like the IUCN. Due to their high endemism to small habitats, they can face threat from general biodiversity threats like habitat loss and degradation due to human causes, climate change, and pollution.

== Species list ==
Currently, 65 species are known and catalogued.

- No subgenus specified
  - Mongoloraphidia abnormis (Liu et al., 2010)
  - Mongoloraphidia alaica (H. Aspöck et al., 1997)
  - Mongoloraphidia assija (H. Aspöck et al., 1995)
  - Mongoloraphidia botanophila (H. Aspöck et al., 1996)
  - Mongoloraphidia dshamilja (H. Aspöck et al., 1995)
  - Mongoloraphidia duomilia (C.-k. Yang, 1998)
  - Mongoloraphidia granulosa (Navás, 1915)
  - Mongoloraphidia gulnara (H. Aspöck et al., 1998)
  - Mongoloraphidia karabaevi (H. Aspöck et al., 1996)
  - Mongoloraphidia kirgisica (H. Aspöck et al., 1983)
  - Mongoloraphidia lini (X.-y. Liu et al., 2018)
  - Mongoloraphidia liupanshanica (Liu et al., 2010)
  - Mongoloraphidia manasiana (H. Aspöck et al., 1996)
  - Mongoloraphidia milkoi (H. Aspöck et al., 1995)
  - Mongoloraphidia nomadobia (H. Aspöck et al., 1996)
  - Mongoloraphidia pudica (H. Aspöck et al., 1985)
  - Mongoloraphidia rhodophila (H. Aspöck et al., 1997)
  - Mongoloraphidia talassicola (H. Aspöck et al., 1996)
  - Mongoloraphidia tienshanica (H. Aspöck et al., 1996)
  - Mongoloraphidia triangulata (X.-y. Liu et al., 2018)
  - Mongoloraphidia xinjiangana (Shen et al., 2022)
  - Mongoloraphidia xiyue (C.-k. Yang & Chou in C.-k. Yang, 1978)
  - Mongoloraphidia yangi (Liu et al., 2010)
- Subgenus: Alatouoraphidia
  - Mongoloraphidia dolinella (U. Aspöck & H. Aspöck, 1991)
  - Mongoloraphidia drapetis (U. Aspöck & H. Aspöck, 1993)
  - Mongoloraphidia eklipes (U. Aspöck & H. Aspöck, 1993)
  - Mongoloraphidia medvedevi (U. Aspöck & H. Aspöck, 1990)
  - Mongoloraphidia pskemiana (H. Aspöck et al., 1999)
  - Mongoloraphidia zhiltzovae (H. Aspöck & U. Aspöck, 1970)
- Subgenus: Ferganoraphidia
  - Mongoloraphidia pusillogenitalis (H. Aspöck et al., 1968)
- Subgenus: Formosoraphidia
  - Mongoloraphidia caelebs (H. Aspöck et al., 1985)
  - Mongoloraphidia curvata (X.-y. Liu et al., 2010)
  - Mongoloraphidia formosana (Okamoto in Nagano, 1917)
  - Mongoloraphidia taiwanica (U. Aspöck & H. Aspöck, 1982)
- Subgenus: Hissaroraphidia
  - Mongoloraphidia gissarica (H. Aspöck et al., 1968)
  - Mongoloraphidia karatauica (H. Aspöck & U. Aspöck, 1995)
  - Mongoloraphidia kelidotocephala (U. Aspöck & H. Aspöck, 1991)
  - Mongoloraphidia kughitanga (H. Aspöck et al., 1997)
  - Mongoloraphidia martynoviella (H. Aspöck & U. Aspöck, 1968)
  - Mongoloraphidia mirabilis (H. Aspöck & U. Aspöck, 1975)
  - Mongoloraphidia tadshikistanica (H. Aspöck et al., 1968)
- Subgenus: Japanoraphidia
  - Mongoloraphidia harmandi (Navás, 1909)
  - Mongoloraphidia occidentalis (X.-y. Liu et al., 2010)
- Subgenus: Kasachoraphidia
  - Mongoloraphidia martynovae (Steinmann, 1964)
- Subgenus: Kirgisoraphidia
  - Mongoloraphidia kaltenbachi (H. Aspöck et al., 2002)
  - Mongoloraphidia mazeppa (H. Aspöck & U. Aspöck, 1972)
  - Mongoloraphidia monstruosa (H. Aspöck et al., 1968)
  - Mongoloraphidia nurgiza (H. Aspöck et al., 1997)
- Subgenus: Mongoloraphidia
  - Mongoloraphidia altaica (H. Aspöck & U. Aspöck, 1966)
  - Mongoloraphidia christophi (H. Aspöck et al., 1982)
  - Mongoloraphidia dsungarica (H. Aspöck & U. Aspöck, 1968)
  - Mongoloraphidia indica (H. Aspöck et al., 1982)
  - Mongoloraphidia kashmirica (H. Aspöck et al., 1982)
  - Mongoloraphidia kaszabi (H. Aspöck & U. Aspöck, 1967)
  - Mongoloraphidia pakistanica (H. Aspöck & U. Aspöck, 1978)
  - Mongoloraphidia remmi (H. Aspöck & U. Aspöck, 1975)
  - Mongoloraphidia sajanica (H. Aspöck et al., 1968)
  - Mongoloraphidia solitaria (H. Aspöck et al., 1982)
  - Mongoloraphidia sororcula (H. Aspöck & U. Aspöck, 1966)
  - Mongoloraphidia virgo (H. Aspöck et al., 1982)
- Subgenus: Neomartynoviella
  - Mongoloraphidia kaspariani (H. Aspöck et al., 1983)
  - Mongoloraphidia tshimganica (H. Aspöck et al., 1968)
- Subgenus: Usbekoraphidia
  - Mongoloraphidia josifovi (Popov, 1974)
  - Mongoloraphidia sejde (H. Aspöck et al., 1995)
  - Mongoloraphidia turkestanica (H. Aspöck et al., 1968)
