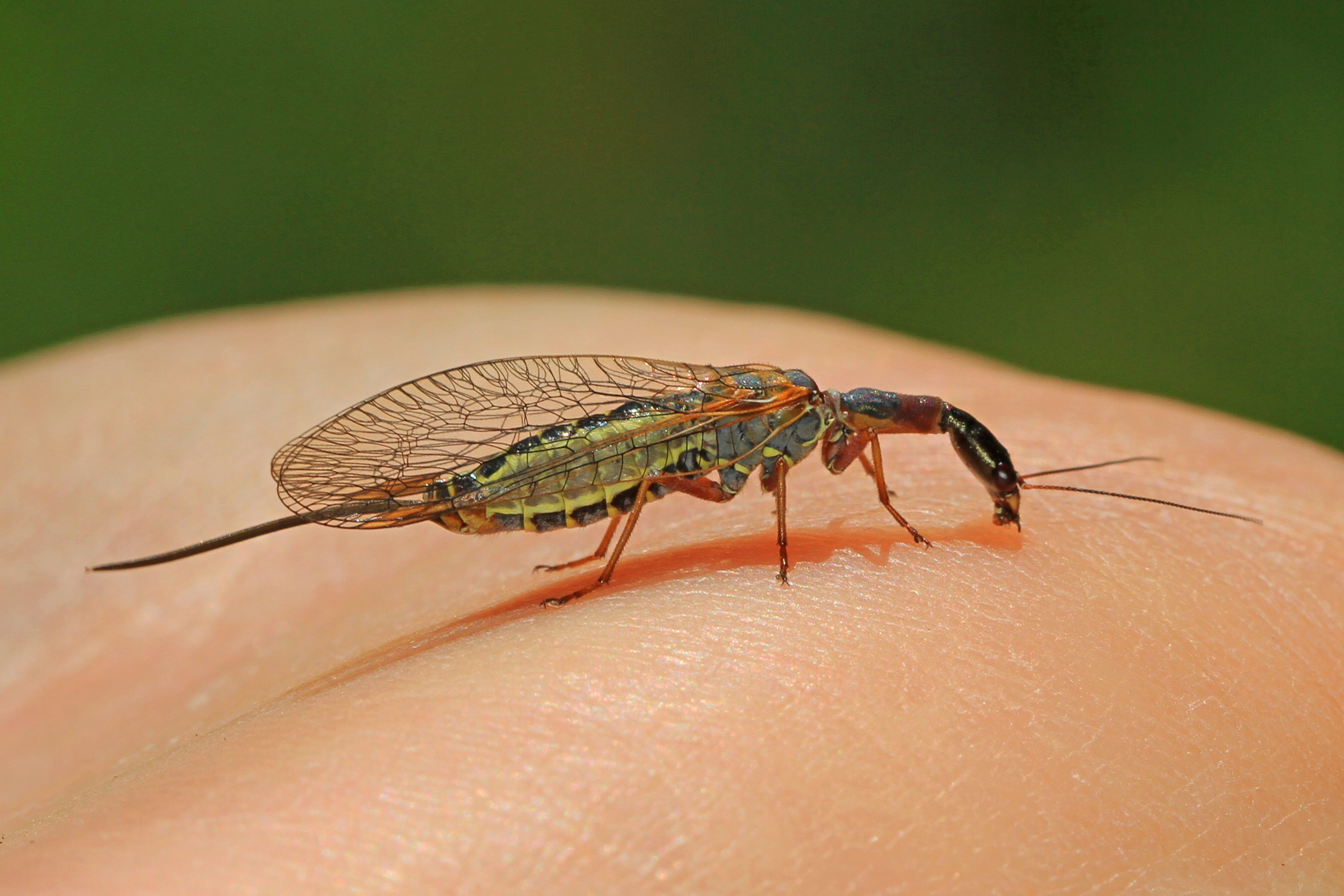
- Agulla species, Packer Lake, California

Scientific classification
- Kingdom: Animalia
- Phylum: Arthropoda
- Class: Insecta
- Order: Raphidioptera
- Family: Raphidiidae
- Subfamily: Raphidiinae
- Tribe: Aguillini
- Genus: Agulla; Navás, 1914

Species
- See text

= Agulla (snakefly) =

Agulla Temporal range: Lutetian-Recent

Genus of insects

Agulla is a genus of snakeflies in the family Raphidiidae.

Agulla species are predatory, both as adults and larvae. They occur in North America in Western Canada (British Columbia) and in the Western United States, specifically in the Rocky Mountains and westward, including the southwestern deserts.

== Systematics ==
At present 31 living and two extinct species of Agulla are known from North America. The species are divided into four subgenera, with the two extinct (†) species left unplaced in the genus.

- Agulla
  - Subgenus Agulla
    - A. (A.) arazonia (Banks)
    - A. (A.) amaudi (Aspöck)
    - A. (A.) assimilis (Albarda)
    - A. (A.) astuta (Banks)
    - A. (A.) barri (Aspöck)
    - A. (A.) bicolor (Albarda)
    - A. (A.) bractea Carpenter
    - A. (A.) crotchi (Banks)
    - A. (A.) faulkneri Aspöck
    - A. (A.) flexa Carpenter
    - A. (A.) herbsti (Ebsen-Peterson
    - A. (A.) Agulla nixa
  - Subgenus Galavia
    - A. (G.) adnixa (Hagen)
    - A. (G.) modesta Carpenter
    - A. (G.) paramerica Aspöck
    - A. (G.) unicolor Carpenter
  - Subgenus Franciscoraphidia
    - A. (F.) directa Carpenter
  - Subgenus Californoraphidia
    - A. (C.) nigrinotum Woglum & McGregor
  - Subgenus incertae sedis
    - †A. mineralensis (Miocene, Stewart Valley, Nevada, USA)
    - †A. protomaculata (Lutetian, Green River Formation, Colorado, USA)
