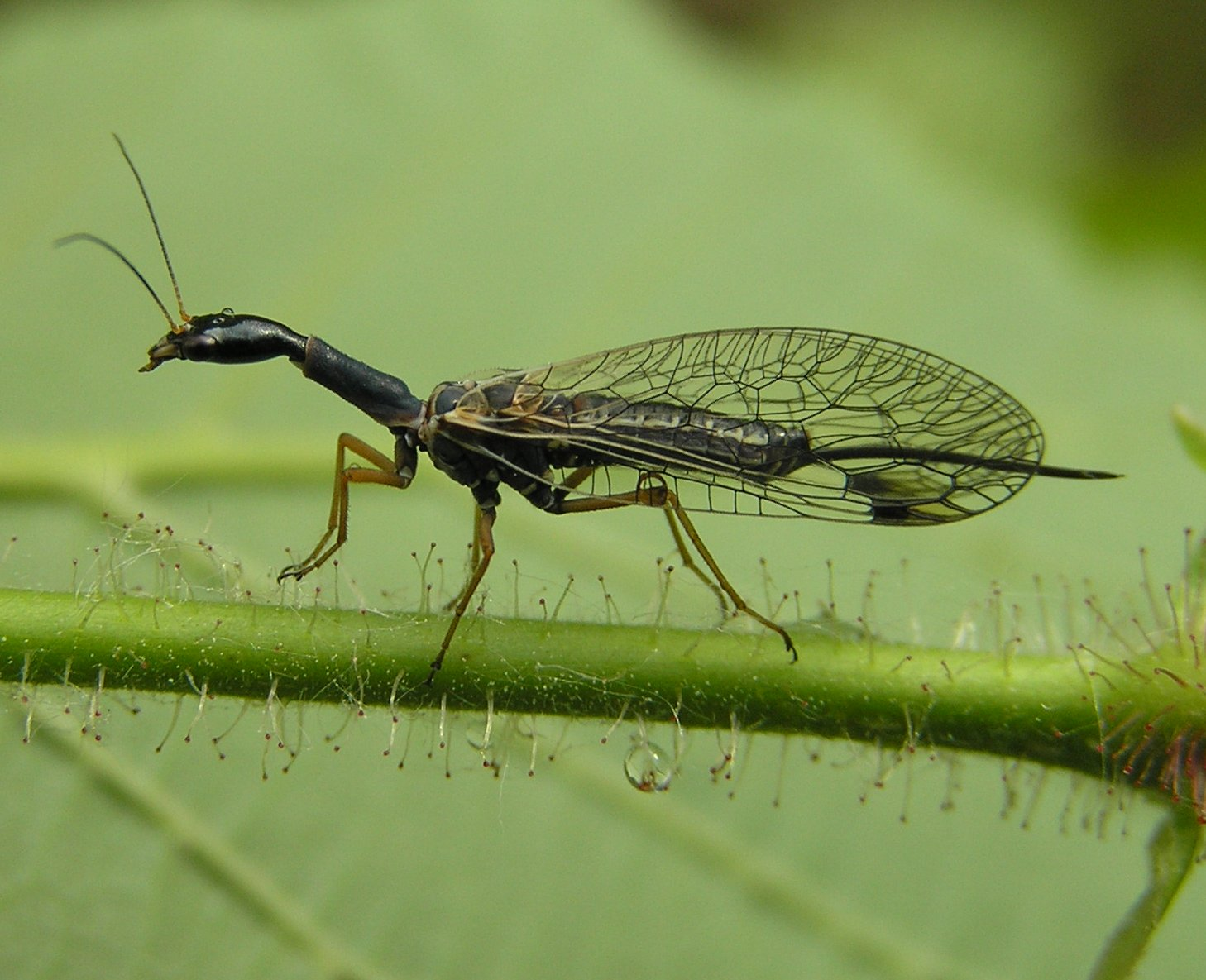
- Dichrostigma flavipes

Scientific classification
- Kingdom: Animalia
- Phylum: Arthropoda
- Class: Insecta
- Order: Raphidioptera
- Family: Raphidiidae
- Genus: Dichrostigma; Navas, 1909

= Dichrostigma =

Genus of insects

Dichrostigma, from Ancient Greek δι (di-), meaning "two", χρώς (khrṓs), meaning "color", and στίγμα (stígma), meaning "brand", is a genus of snakeflies in the family Raphidiidae. There are about five described species in the genus.

== Species ==
The following species are listed in the genus Dichrostigma:

- Dichrostigma adananum (Albarda, 1891)
- Dichrostigma flavipes (Stein, 1863)
- Dichrostigma hungaricum (Navás, 1915)
- Dichrostigma malickyi (H.Aspöck & U.Aspöck, 1964)
- Dichrostigma mehadia (H.Aspöck & U.Aspöck, 1964)
