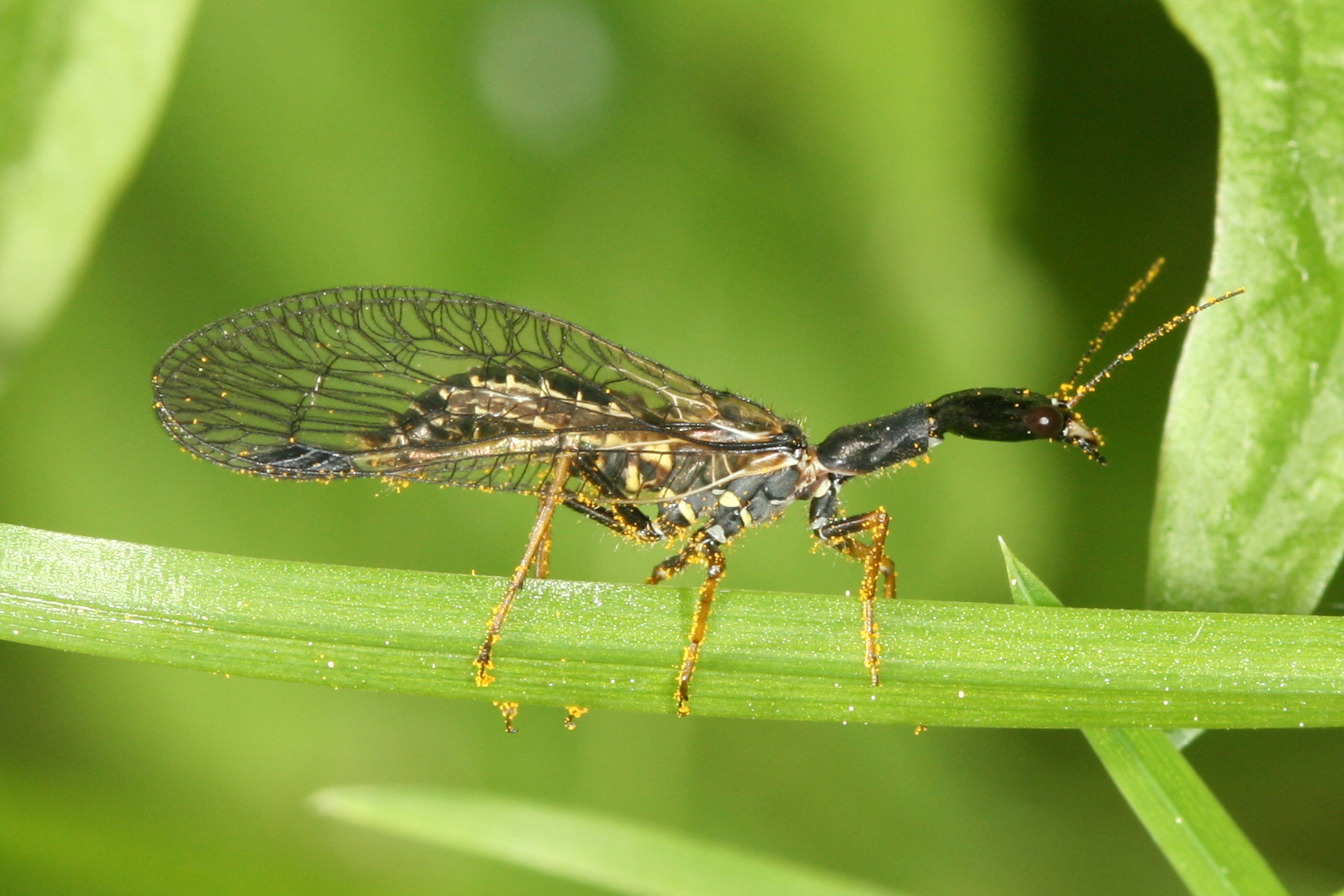
- Phaeostigma notata

Scientific classification
- Kingdom: Animalia
- Phylum: Arthropoda
- Class: Insecta
- Order: Raphidioptera
- Family: Raphidiidae
- Genus: Phaeostigma; Navás, 1909

= Phaeostigma =

Genus of insects

Phaeostigma, from Ancient Greek φαιός (phaiós), meaning "gray", and στίγμα (stígma), meaning "brand", is a Palaearctic genus of snakeflies in the family Raphidiidae.

== Species ==
The following are included in BioLib.cz:

subgenus Aegeoraphidia Aspöck & Rausch, 1991

1. Phaeostigma biroi (Navás, 1915)
2. Phaeostigma karpathana U. Aspöck & H. Aspöck, 1989
3. Phaeostigma noane (H. Aspöck & U. Aspöck, 1966)
4. Phaeostigma propheticum (H. Aspöck & U. Aspöck, 1964)
5. Phaeostigma raddai (U. Aspöck & H. Aspöck, 1970)
6. Phaeostigma remane (H. Aspöck et al., 1976)
7. Phaeostigma ressli (H. Aspöck & U. Aspöck, 1964)
8. Phaeostigma vartianorum (H. Aspöck & U. Aspöck, 1965)

subgenus Caucasoraphidia Aspöck & Aspöck, 1968

1. Phaeostigma caucasicum (Esben-Petersen, 1913)
2. Phaeostigma resslianum (H. Aspöck & U. Aspöck, 1970)

subgenus Crassoraphidia Aspöck & Aspöck, 1968

1. Phaeostigma cypricum (Hagen, 1867)
2. Phaeostigma klimeschiellum H. Aspöck et al., 1982
3. Phaeostigma knappi (H. Aspöck & U. Aspöck, 1967)

subgenus Graecoraphidia Aspöck & Aspöck, 1968

1. Phaeostigma albarda Rausch & H. Aspöck, 1991
2. Phaeostigma divinum (H. Aspöck & U. Aspöck, 1964)
3. Phaeostigma hoelzeli (H. Aspöck & U. Aspöck, 1964)

subgenus Magnoraphidia Aspöck & Aspöck, 1968

1. Phaeostigma flammi (H. Aspöck & U. Aspöck, 1973)
2. Phaeostigma horticolum (H. Aspöck & U. Aspöck, 1973)
3. Phaeostigma klimeschi (H. Aspöck & U. Aspöck, 1964)
4. Phaeostigma major (Burmeister, 1839)
5. Phaeostigma robustum (H. Aspöck & U. Aspöck, 1966)
6. Phaeostigma wewalkai (H. Aspöck & U. Aspöck, 1971)

subgenus Miroraphidia Aspöck & Aspöck, 1968

1. Phaeostigma curvatulum (H. Aspöck & U. Aspöck, 1964)

subgenus Phaeostigma Navás, 1909

1. Phaeostigma euboicum (H. Aspöck & U. Aspöck, 1976)
2. Phaeostigma galloitalicum (H. Aspöck & U. Aspöck, 1976)
3. Phaeostigma italogallicum (H. Aspöck & U. Aspöck, 1976)
4. Phaeostigma notata (Fabricius, 1781)
5. Phaeostigma pilicollis (Stein, 1863)
6. Phaeostigma promethei H. Aspöck et al., 1983

subgenus Pontoraphidia Aspöck & Aspöck, 1968

1. Phaeostigma grandii (Principi, 1960)
2. Phaeostigma ponticum (Albarda, 1891)
3. Phaeostigma rhodopicum (Klapálek, 1894)
4. Phaeostigma setulosum (H. Aspöck & U. Aspöck, 1967)

subgenus Superboraphidia Aspöck & Aspöck, 1968

1. Phaeostigma auberti (H. Aspöck & U. Aspöck, 1966)
2. Phaeostigma mammaphilum (H. Aspöck & U. Aspöck, 1974)
3. Phaeostigma minois U. Aspöck & H. Aspöck, 1990
4. Phaeostigma rauschi (H. Aspöck & U. Aspöck, 1970)
5. Phaeostigma turcicum (H. Aspöck et al., 1981)

Unplaced species

1. Phaeostigma holzingeri Rausch & H. Aspöck, 1993
2. Phaeostigma longicaudum (Stein, 1863) (Phaeostigma longicauda ?)
3. Phaeostigma major (Burmeister, 1839)
4. Phaeostigma thaleri (H. Aspöck & U. Aspöck, 1964)
