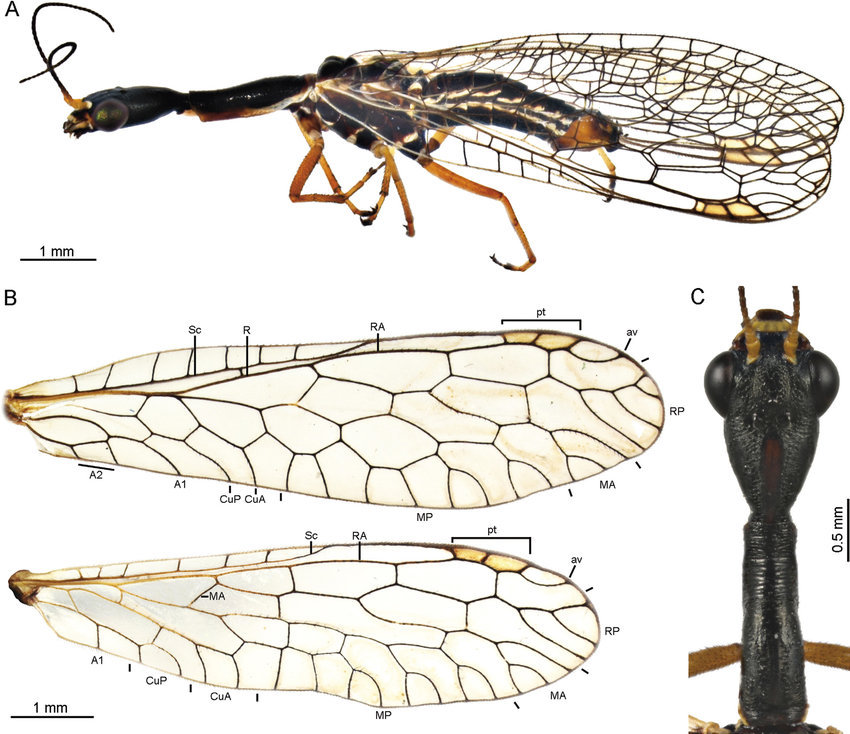
- Lateral View of Holotype Male Alena Aztekoraphidia-alanae

Scientific classification
- Kingdom: Animalia
- Phylum: Arthropoda
- Class: Insecta
- Order: Raphidioptera
- Family: Raphidiidae
- Subfamily: Raphidiinae
- Genus: Alena; Navás, 1916

Species
- See text

= Alena (snakefly) =

Genus of insects

Alena is a genus of snakeflies in the family Raphidiidae. All species are predatory, both as adults and larvae. They occur in North America in the South-Western United States and Western to Central Mexico.

== Systematics ==
At present 11 living species of Alena are known.

- Alena
  - Subgenus Alena
    - Alena (Alena) distincta (Banks, 1911)
  - Subgenus Aztekoraphidia
    - Alena (Aztekoraphidia) alanae Martins, Aspöck, Aspöck & Contreras-Ramos, 2022
    - Alena (Aztekoraphidia) australis (Banks, 1895)
    - Alena (Aztekoraphidia) caudata (Navás, 1914)
    - Alena (Aztekoraphidia) horstaspoecki U. Aspöck & Contreras-Ramos, 2004
    - Alena (Aztekoraphidia) infundibulata U. Aspöck et al., 1994
    - Alena (Aztekoraphidia) michoacana U. Aspöck & H. Aspöck, 2013
    - Alena (Aztekoraphidia) minuta (Banks, 1903)
    - Alena (Aztekoraphidia) schremmeri U. Aspöck et al., 1994
    - Alena (Aztekoraphidia) tenochtitlana U. Aspöck & H. Aspöck, 1978)
  - Subgenus Mexicoraphidia
    - Alena (Mexicoraphidia) americana (Carpenter, 1959)
