= Puncha, Purulia =

Puncha
- Village
- Location in West Bengal, India Puncha (India)
- Coordinates: 23°09′46.8″N 86°39′07.2″E
- Country: India
- State: West Bengal
- District: Purulia

Population (2011)
  - Total: 5,404

Languages
  - Official: Bengali, English
- Time zone: UTC+5:30 (IST)
- PIN: 723151 (Puncha)
- Telephone/STD code: 03253
- Lok Sabha constituency: Purulia
- Vidhan Sabha constituency: Manbazar
- Website: purulia.gov.in

Puncha is a village, with a police station, and a gram panchayat in the Puncha CD block in the Manbazar subdivision of the Purulia district in the state of West Bengal, India.

== Geography ==
Places in Manbazar subdivision in Purulia district
CT: census town, R: rural/ urban centre, H: historical/ religious centre
Owing to space constraints in the small map, the actual locations in a larger map may vary slightly

=== Location ===
Puncha is located at 23°09′46.8″N 86°39′07.2″E.

=== Area overview ===
Purulia district forms the lowest step of the Chota Nagpur Plateau. The general scenario is undulating land with scattered hills. Manbazar subdivision, shown in the map alongside, is located in the eastern part of the district. It is an overwhelmingly rural subdivision with 96.32% of the population living in the rural areas and 3.68% living in the urban areas. There are 3 census towns in the subdivision. The map shows the Kangsabati Project Reservoir. The Mukutmanipur Dam is in Bankura district but the upper portion of the reservoir is in Manbazar subdivision. The remnants of old temples and deities are found in the subdivision also, as in other parts of the district. The subdivision has a very high proportion of Scheduled Castes and Scheduled Tribes. Bandwan CD block has 51.86% ST population, Manbazar II CD block has 48.97% ST population. Manbazar I CD block has 22.03% ST and 22.44% SC. Puncha CD block has 24.74% ST and 14.54 SC. Writing in 1911, H. Coupland, ICS, speaks of the aboriginal races largely predominating in the old Manbhum district. He particularly mentions the Kurmis, Santhals, Bhumij and Bauri.

Note: The map alongside presents some of the notable locations in the subdivision. All places marked in the map are linked in the larger full screen map.

== Demographics ==
According to the 2011 Census of India, Puncha had a total population of 5,404 of which 2,744(51%) were males and 2,660 (49%) were females. There were 573 persons in the age range of 0–6 years. The total number of literate persons in Puncha was 3,788 (78.41% of the population over 6 years).

== Civic administration ==
=== Police station ===
Puncha police station has jurisdiction over parts of the Puncha and Manbazar I CD blocks. The area covered is 330.11 km^{2} and the population covered is 123,768.

=== CD block HQ ===
The headquarters of the Puncha CD block are located at Puncha.

== Transport ==
Hura-Puncha Road and Puncha-Payrachali Road meet at Puncha.

== Culture ==
Pakbirra, famous for its Jain temples, is located close by.

== Healthcare ==
Puncha Rural Hospital, with 30 beds, is a major government medical facility in Puncha CD block.
