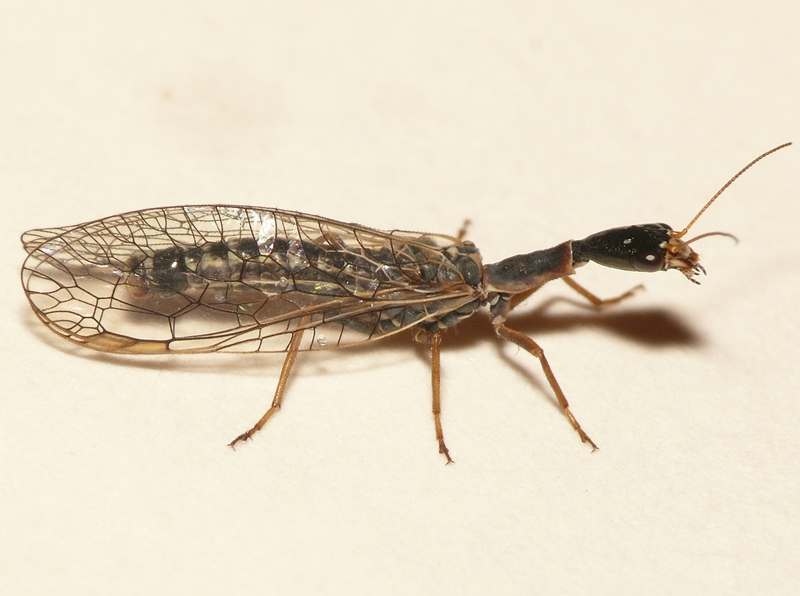
- Xanthostigma xanthostigma

Scientific classification
- Domain: Eukaryota
- Kingdom: Animalia
- Phylum: Arthropoda
- Class: Insecta
- Order: Raphidioptera
- Family: Raphidiidae
- Genus: Xanthostigma; Navás, 1909

= Xanthostigma =

Genus of snakeflies

Xanthostigma is a genus of snakeflies belonging to the family Raphidiidae.

The species of this genus are found in Europe.

Species:

- Xanthostigma aloysianum (Costa, 1855)
- Xanthostigma corsicum (Hagen, 1867)
- Xanthostigma gobicola (U.Aspöck & H.Aspöck, 1990)
- Xanthostigma xanthostigma (Schummel, 1832)
- Xanthostigma zdravka (Popov, 1978)
