= Pakbirra =

- Village
- Location in West Bengal, India Pakbirra (India)
- Coordinates: 23.1535°N 86.6658°E
- Country: India
- State: West Bengal
- District: Purulia

Population (2011)
  - Total: 1,754

Languages
  - Official: Bengali, English
- Time zone: UTC+5:30 (IST)
- PIN: 723151
- Telephone/STD code: 03253
- Lok Sabha constituency: Purulia
- Vidhan Sabha constituency: Manbazar
- Website: purulia.gov.in

Pakbirra is a village in the Puncha CD block in the Manbazar subdivision of the Purulia district in the state of West Bengal, India.

== Geography ==
Places in Manbazar subdivision in Purulia district
CT: census town, R: rural/ urban centre, H: historical/ religious centre
Owing to space constraints in the small map, the actual locations in a larger map may vary slightly

=== Location ===
Pakbirra is located at 23.1535°N 86.6658°E.

=== Area overview ===
Purulia district forms the lowest step of the Chota Nagpur Plateau. The general scenario is undulating land with scattered hills. Manbazar subdivision, shown in the map alongside, is located in the eastern part of the district. It is an overwhelmingly rural subdivision with 96.32% of the population living in the rural areas and 3.68% living in the urban areas. There are 3 census towns in the subdivision. The map shows the Kangsabati Project Reservoir. The Mukutmanipur Dam is in Bankura district but the upper portion of the reservoir is in Manbazar subdivision. The remnants of old temples and deities are found in the subdivision also, as in other parts of the district. The subdivision has a very high proportion of Scheduled Castes and Scheduled Tribes. Bandwan CD block has 51.86% ST population, Manbazar II CD block has 48.97% ST population. Manbazar I CD block has 22.03% ST and 22.44% SC. Puncha CD block has 24.74% ST and 14.54 SC. Writing in 1911, H. Coupland, ICS, speaks of the aboriginal races largely predominating in the old Manbhum district. He particularly mentions the Kurmis, Santhals, Bhumij and Bauri.

Note: The map alongside presents some of the notable locations in the subdivision. All places marked in the map are linked in the larger full screen map.

== Demographics ==
According to the 2011 Census of India, Pakbirra had a total population of 1,754, of which 864 (49%) were males and 890 (51%) were females. There were 219 persons in the age range of 0–6 years. The total number of literate persons in Pakbirra was 1,081 (70.42% of the population over 6 years).

== Transport ==
Pakbirra is about 40 km from Purulia town. A short stretch of local roads link Pakbirra to Puncha town.

== Pakbirra Jain temples ==
Pakbirra Jain temples are a collection of three temples. Relics here date back to the ninth and tenth centuries AD. Most impressive of sculptures present in this temple is the colossal 7.5 feet high statue Shitalnatha and 8 feet high statue of Padmaprabha carved of polished black stone. Statue of Padmaprabha is also worshipped as Bhairavnath by people of Hindus faith. The temple has many sculptures including sculptures of Tirthankar Rishabhnath, Parshvanatha, Mahavira along with Goddess Devi Ambika and Padmavati.

This temple have the basic tri-ratha plan with simplified squad of moldings and several level of the wall niches and lower façade stones. The large amalaka fragments lying about, and the stone kalasha with lotus buds emerging of nagara styling. The principal temple, contains preliminary chambers and sanctum. That temple, facing west, perhaps enshrined the colossal figure of a Tirthankar over 2 meters high, with lotus symbol on its pedestal. The temple also has sculptures of eight standing tirthankaras, including three Rishabhanatha, 2 of Mahavira, Sambhavanatha, Padmaprabha, Chandraprabha and two images of Yaksha and Yakshi beneath a tree with a Jina in the branches. Three ayagapata or votive stupas and an idol of ambika with child and attendant, standing on her lion, beneath a flowering tea are also present here.

== Pakbirra picture gallery ==
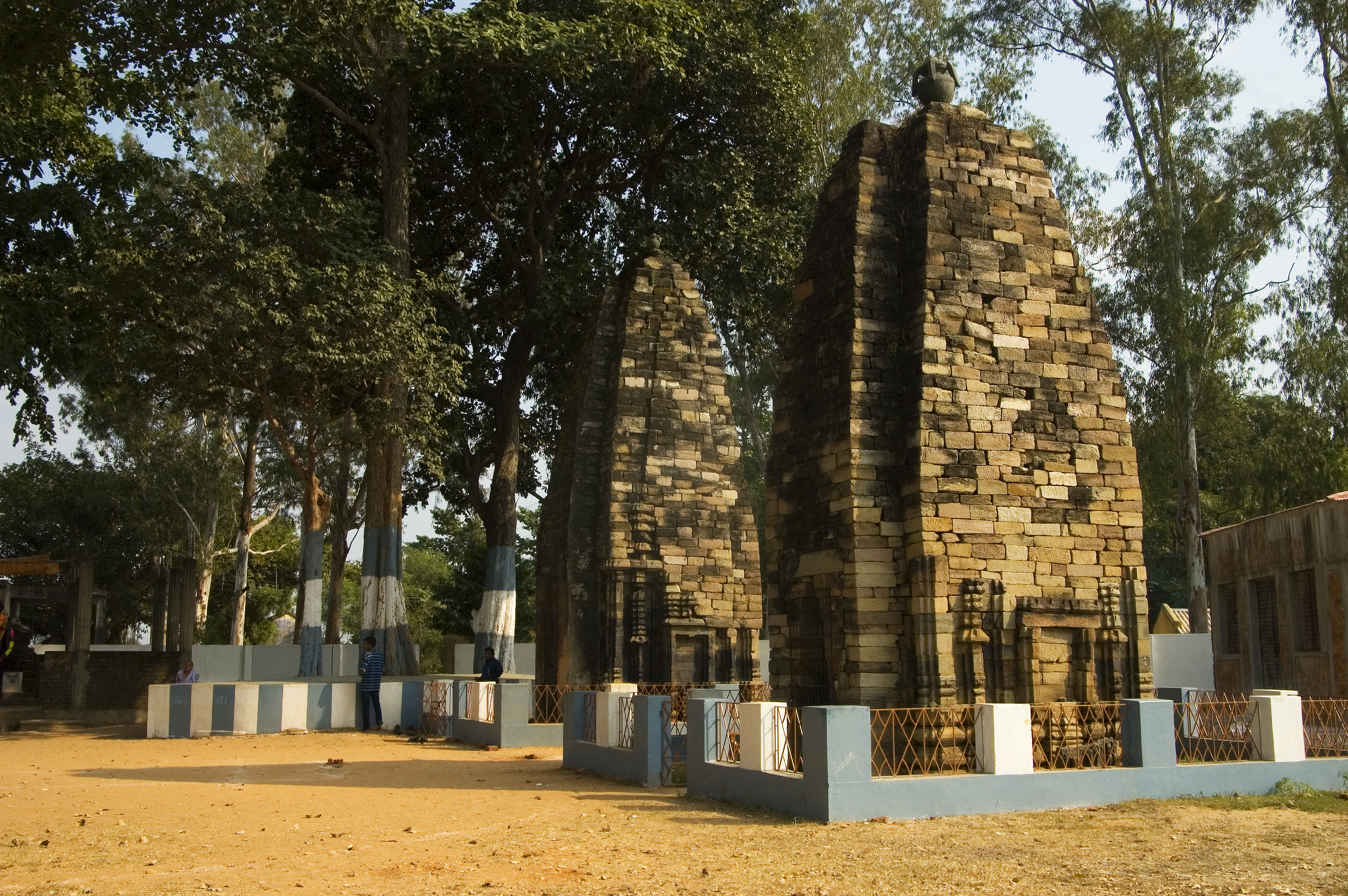
Pakbirra Jain Shrine

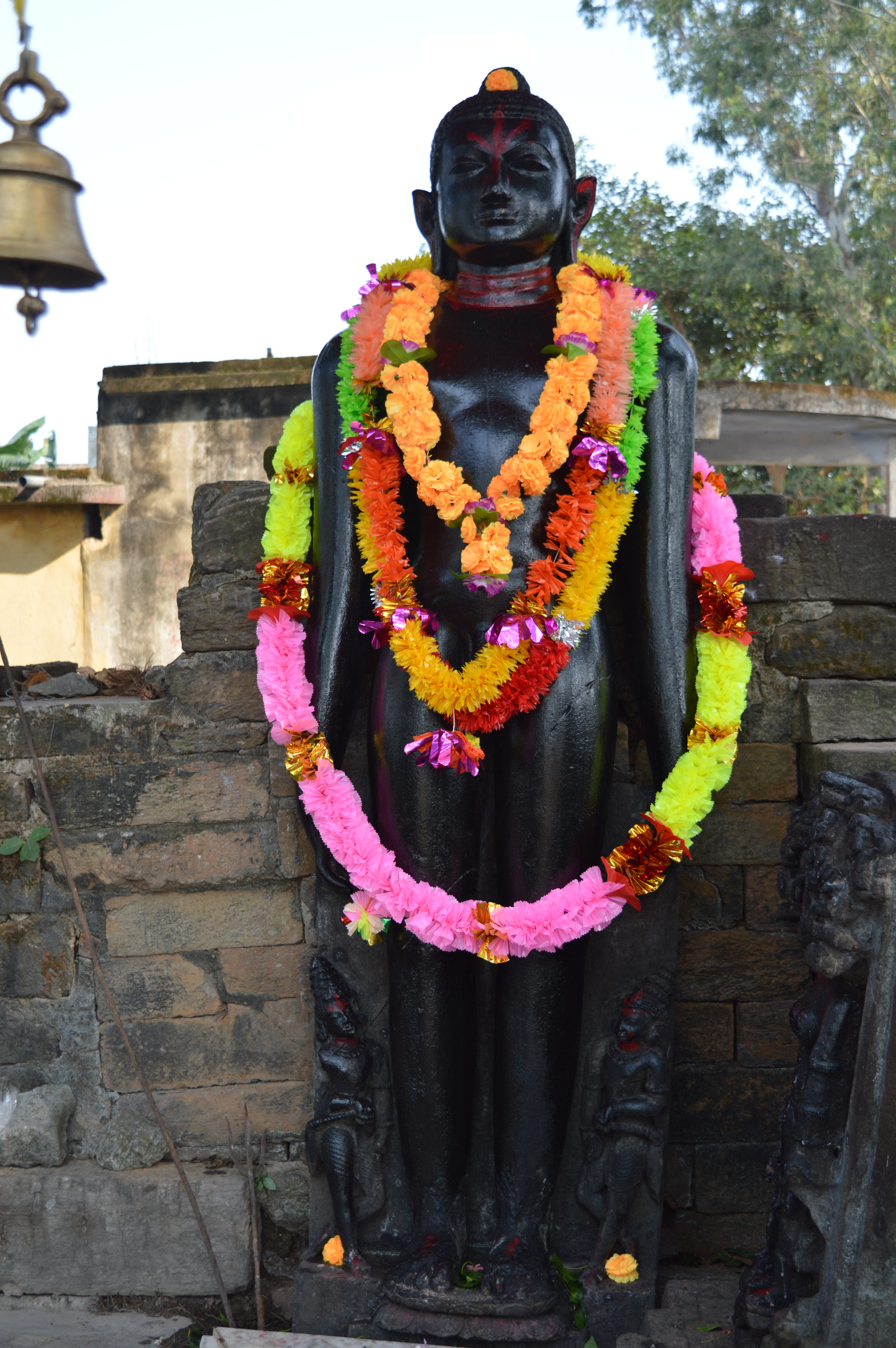
7.5 feet statue of Shitalanatha

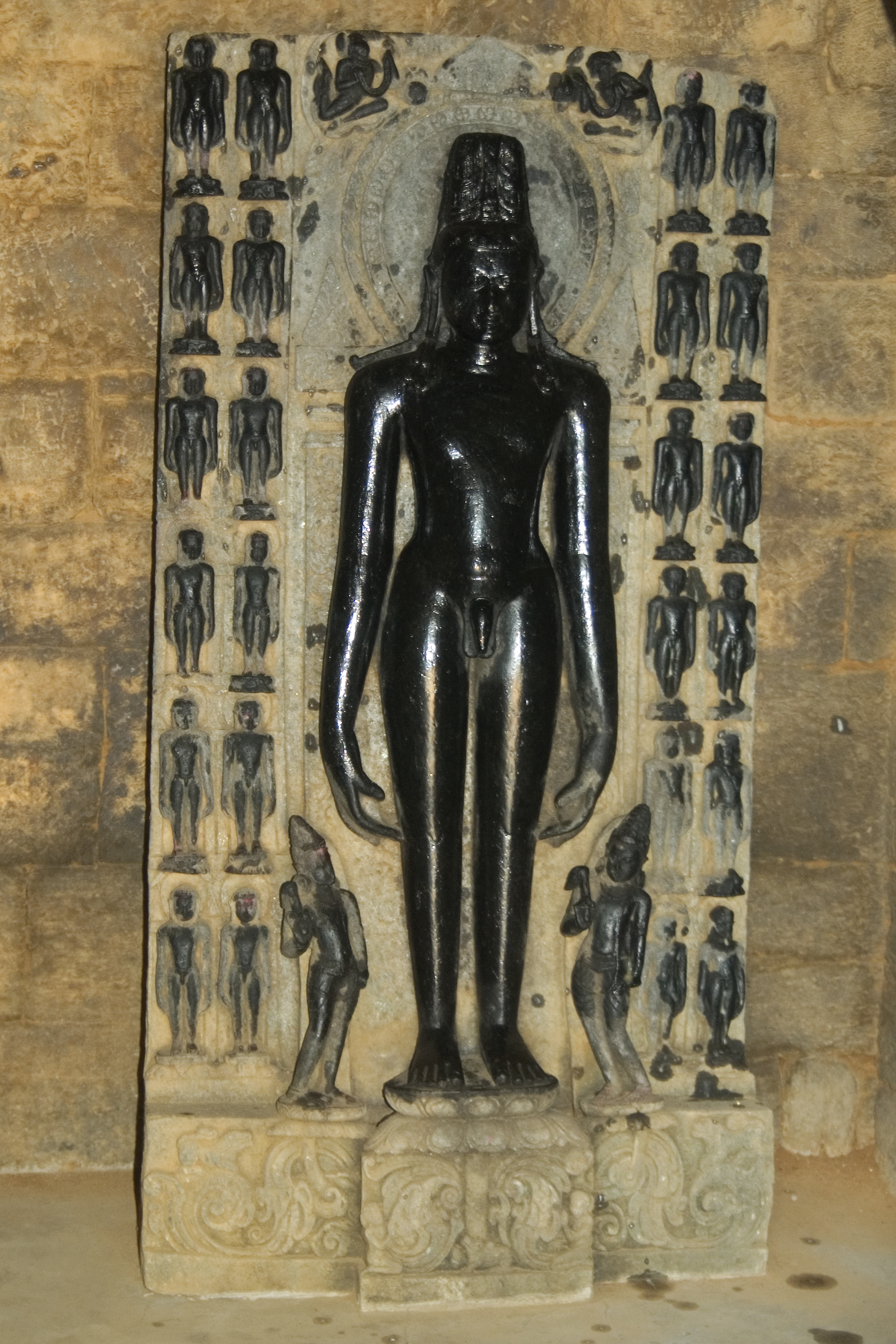
4 ft. high Statue of Adinath at Pakbirra Jain Shrine, Purulia

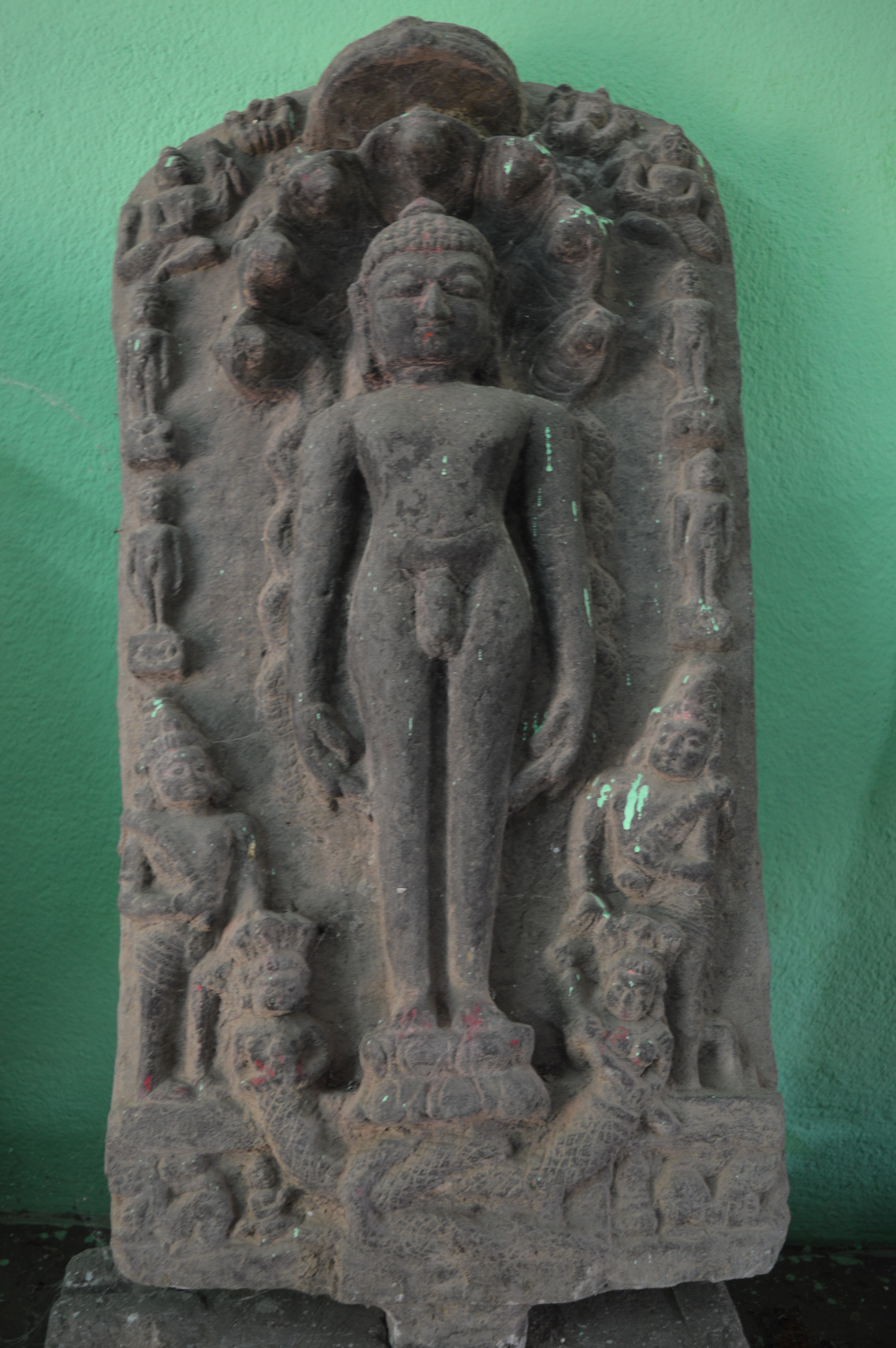
Parshvanatha idol

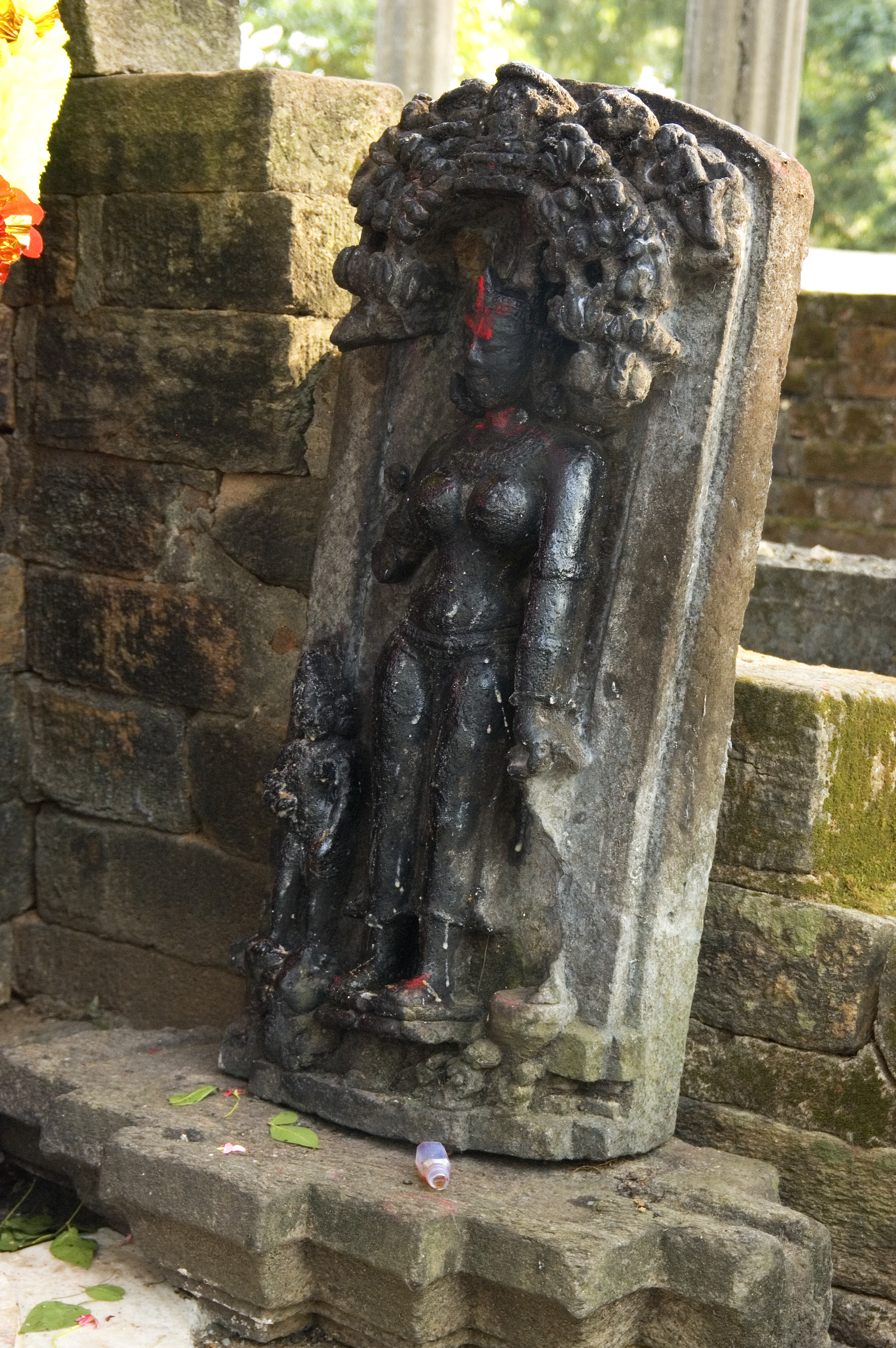
Statue of Ambika at Pakbirra

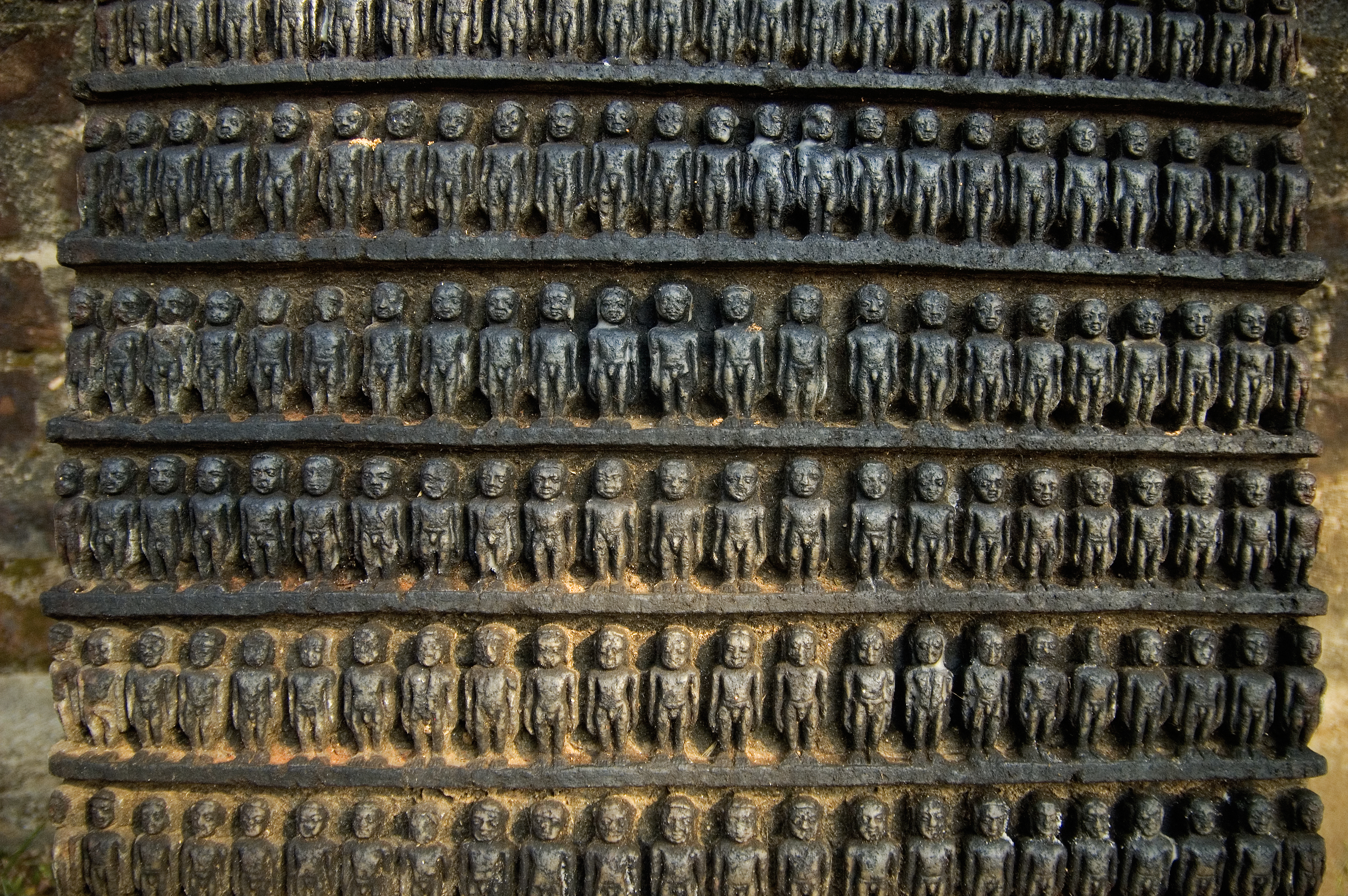
Sahstra pat - a stone plate housing 356 idols of Tirthankars with Lord Adinath seated in the middle
