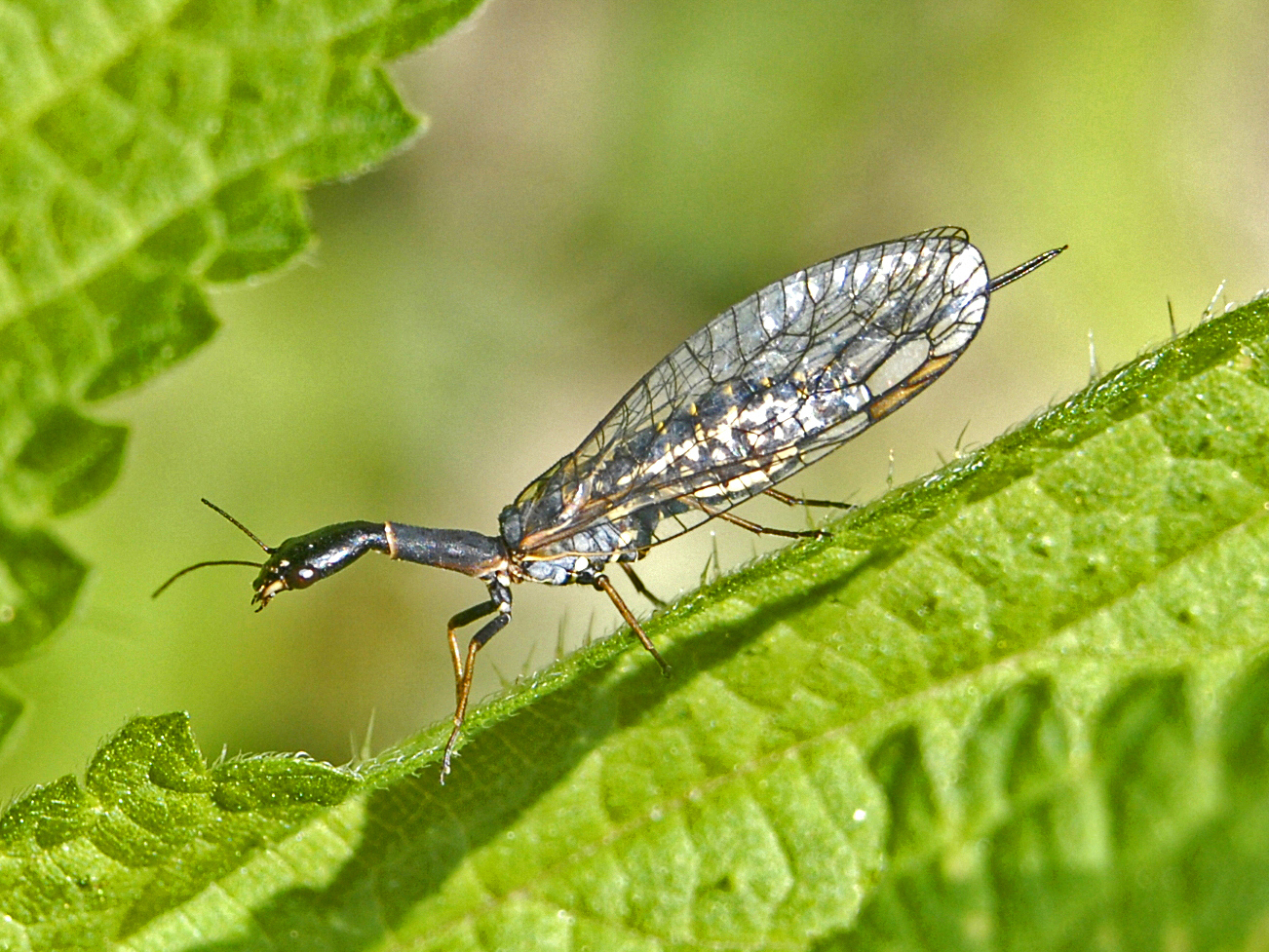
- Puncha ratzeburgi, female

Scientific classification
- Domain: Eukaryota
- Kingdom: Animalia
- Phylum: Arthropoda
- Class: Insecta
- Order: Raphidioptera
- Family: Raphidiidae
- Genus: Puncha; Navàs, 1915
- Species: P. ratzeburgi

Binomial name
- Puncha ratzeburgi (Brauer, 1876)

Synonyms
- Agulla ratzenburgi (Brauer, 1876); Raphidilla alpina (Steinmann, 1964); Rhaphidilla alpina Steinmann, 1964; Raphidia ratzeburgi Brauer, 1876

= Puncha ratzeburgi =

Species of insect

Puncha ratzeburgi is a species of snakefly in the monotypic genus Puncha belonging to the family Raphidiidae.

== Distribution and habitat ==
This species is widely distributed in Central and Eastern Europe (Austria, Bulgaria, Croatia, Czech Republic, France, Germany, Hungary, Italy, Slovakia, Slovenia and Switzerland). Isolated populations have been found from southern France, the Apennine and Balkan Peninsula. These insects inhabit mountains at an elevation up to 1,100 metres (3,600 ft) above sea level.

== Description ==
Puncha ratzeburgi can reach a wingspan of about 24 millimetres (0.94 in). These snakeflies have a long prothorax, hyaline wings with characteristic venation, a distinct pterostigma ranging from yellow-ocher to ocher-brown, and a long ovipositor in females.

== Biology ==
They are predatory, both as adults and larvae.

== Gallery ==
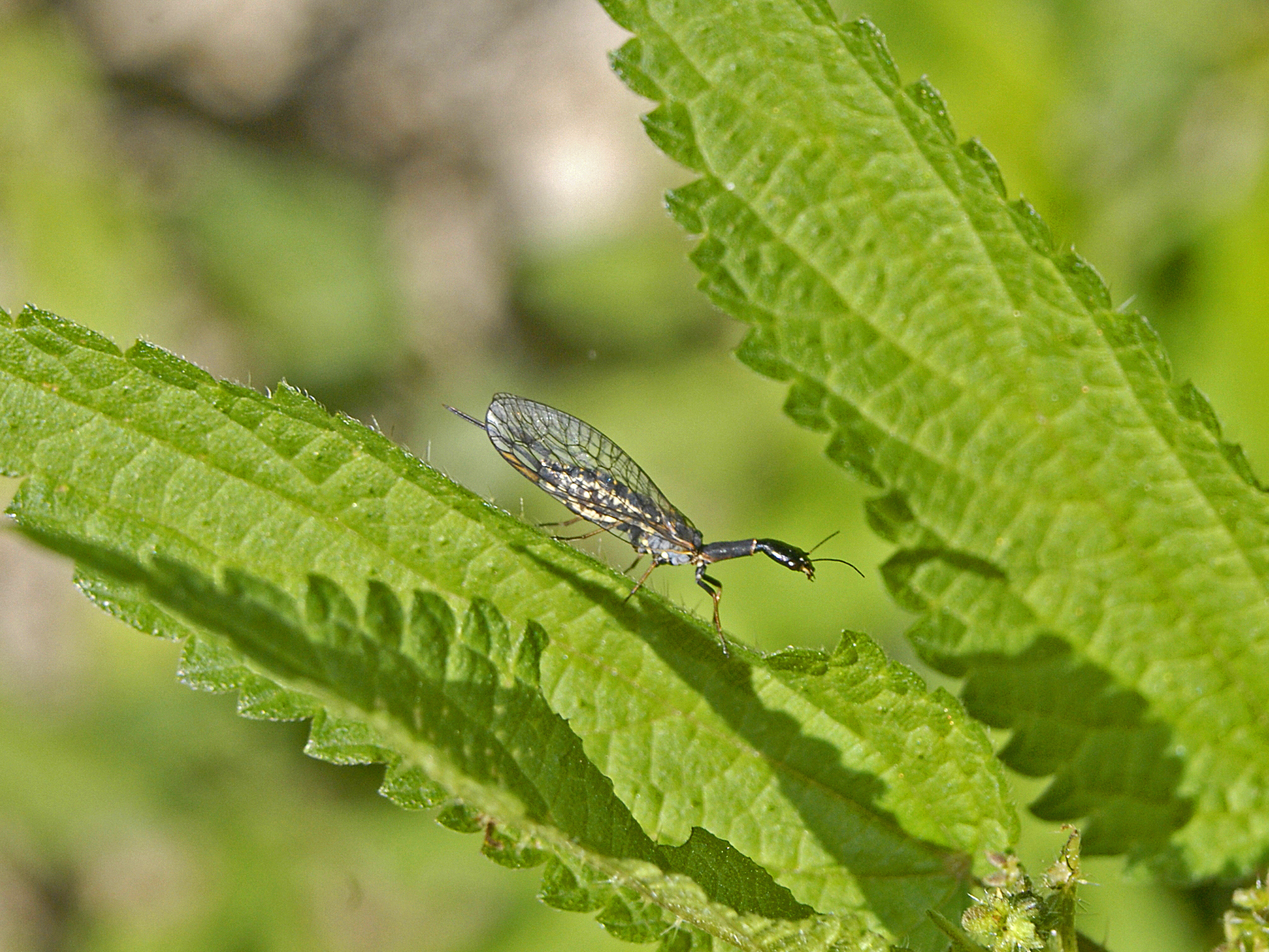

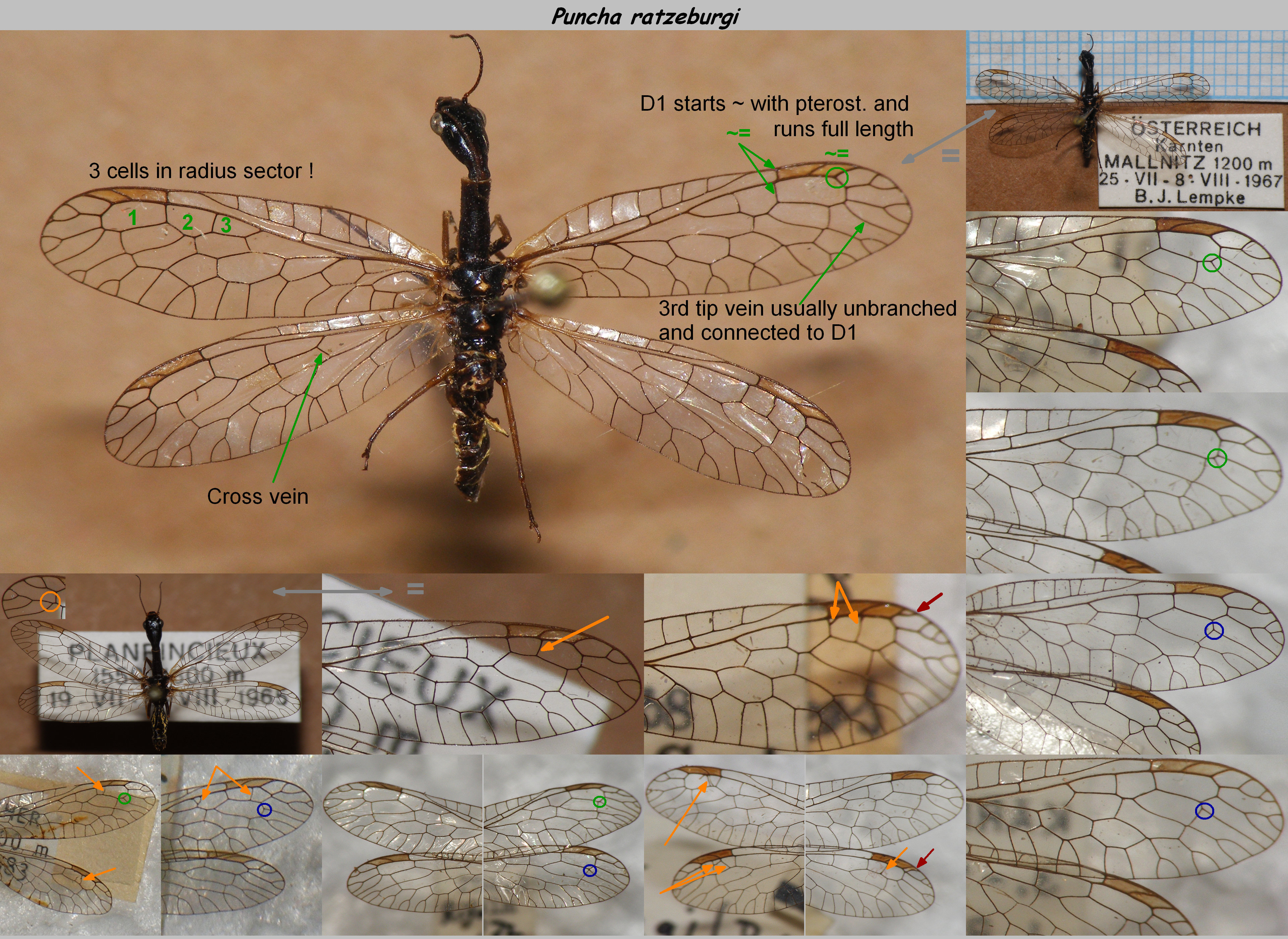
Museum specimen
