= Transactions of the Kansas Academy of Science =

- Discipline: Multidisciplinary
- Language: English
- Edited by: Michael J. Everhart, Roy Beckemeyer

Publication details
- Former name: Transactions of the Annual Meetings of the Kansas Academy of Science
- History: 1872-present
- Publisher: Kansas Academy of Science (United States)
- Frequency: Biannual

Standard abbreviations
- ISO 4: Trans. Kans. Acad. Sci.

Indexing
- CODEN: TSASAH
- ISSN: 0022-8443 (print); 1938-5420 (web)
- LCCN: 12033006
- JSTOR: 00228443
- OCLC no.: 716094338

Links
- Journal homepage; Online access at BioOne

Transactions of the Kansas Academy of Science is a biannual peer-reviewed academic journal published by the Kansas Academy of Science. The journal covers biological and physical sciences, mathematics and computer science, history, culture, and philosophy of science, and science education. The journal is abstracted and indexed in The Zoological Record and BIOSIS Previews.
