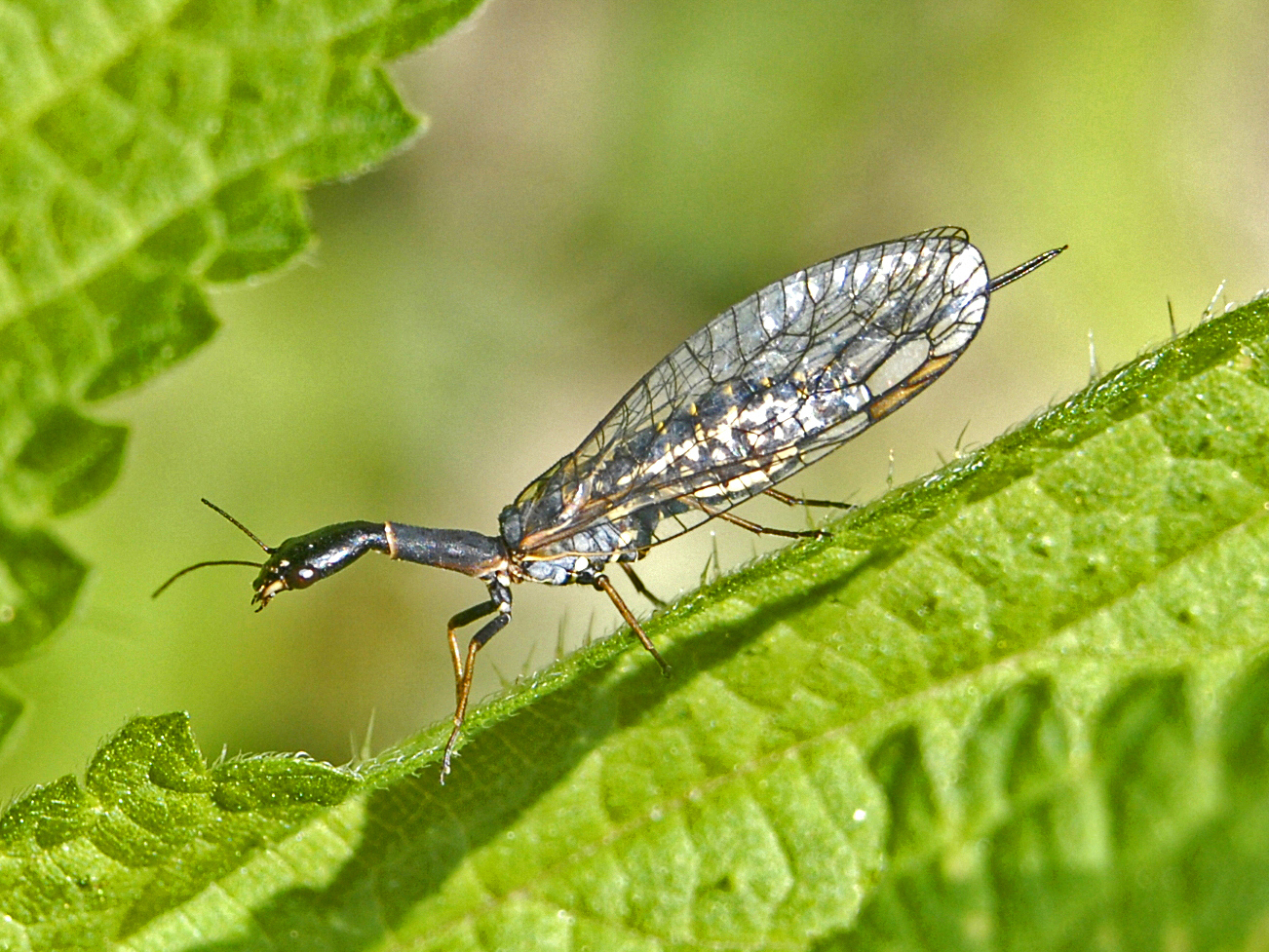
- Puncha ratzeburgi, female

Scientific classification
- Kingdom: Animalia
- Phylum: Arthropoda
- Class: Insecta
- Order: Raphidioptera
- Suborder: Raphidiomorpha
- Family: Raphidiidae; Latreille, 1810

Subfamilies
- See text

= Raphidiidae =

Family of insects

Raphidiidae is a family of snakeflies in the order Raphidioptera, based on the type genus Raphidia.

== Genera ==
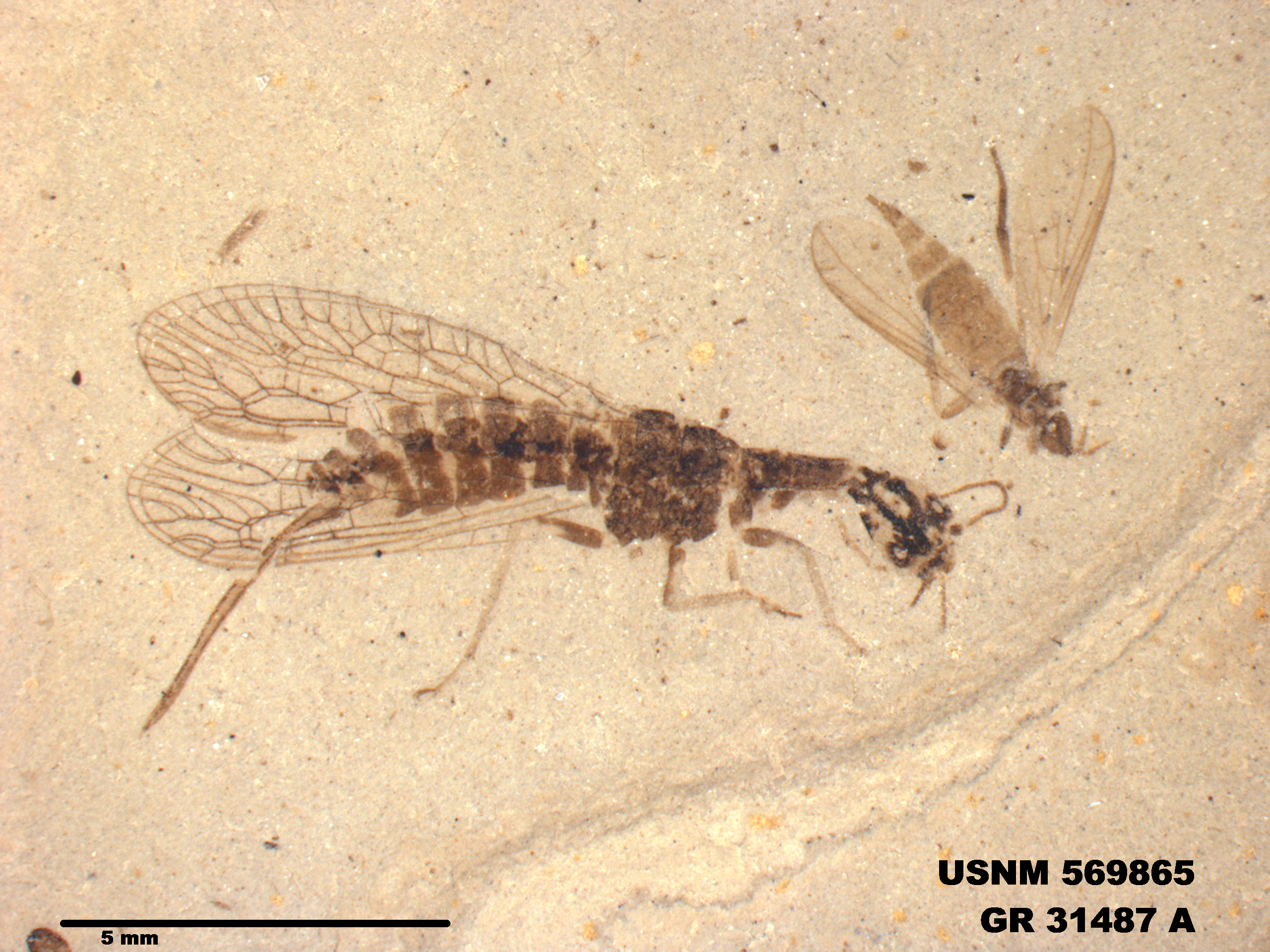
† Archiinocellia protomaculata Ypresian, Green River Formation

Raphidiidae includes the following genera, with more than 200 extant species, all placed in the subfamily Raphidiinae:

Raphidiinae Latreille, 1810

- Agullini Engel
  - Agulla Navás, 1914
- Alenini Engel
  - Alena Navás, 1916
- Raphidiini Latreille, 1810
- †Archiraphidia (Eocene; United States)
- Africoraphidia Aspöck & Aspöck, 1969
- Atlantoraphidia
- Calabroraphidia
- Dichrostigma Navás, 1909
- Harraphidia Steinmann, 1963
- Hispanoraphidia
- Iranoraphidia
- Italoraphidia
- Mauroraphidia Aspöck, Aspöck, & Rausch, 1983
- Mongoloraphidia
- Ohmella H. Aspöck & U. Aspöck
- Ornatoraphidia
- Parvoraphidia
- Phaeostigma
- Puncha Navás, 1915
- Raphidia Linnaeus, 1758
- Subilla
- Tadshikoraphidia
- Tauroraphidia
- Tjederiraphidia
- Turcoraphidia
- Ulrike
- Venustoraphidia
- Xanthostigma

†Succinoraphidiinae Aspöck & Aspöck, 2004

- †Succinoraphidia Aspöck & Aspöck, 2004

Incertae sedis

- †Archiinocellia Handlirsch, 1910 (Eocene; Canada, United States)
- †Florissantoraphidia Makarkin & Archibald, 2014 (Priabonian; United States)
- †Megaraphidia Cockerell, 1907 (Eocene; Canada, United States)
