= Tasersuatsiaq =

Lake in central-western Greenland

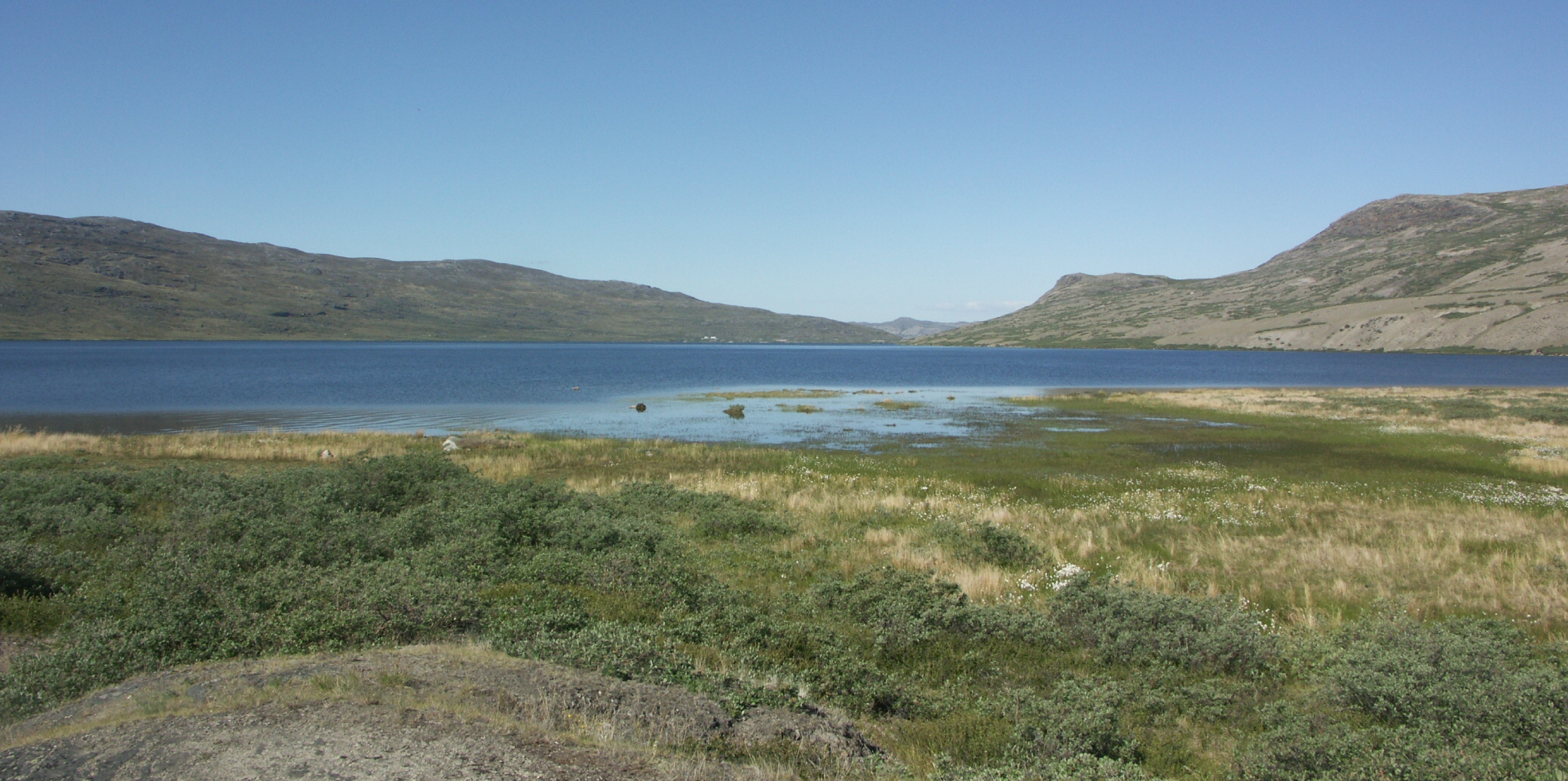
- Tasersuatsiaq seen from the eastern shore, giving a distorted perspective of shape

- Location within Greenland
- Location: Kangerlussuaq, Greenland
- Coordinates: 66°58′25″N 50°39′00″W
- Type: oligotroph
- Basin countries: Greenland
- Max. length: 6 km (3.7 mi)
- Max. width: 2 km (1.2 mi)
- Surface area: 750 ha (1,900 acres)
- Average depth: 80 m (260 ft)

Tasersuatsiaq (old spelling: Taserssuatsiaq) is a lake in central-western Greenland, in the Qeqqata municipality. It is located southeast of Kangerlussuaq, with a depth of 80 m (262.5 ft), covering an area of 750 hectares (1,900 acres).

Some traces of prehistoric gatherings sites are identified on the lake. During the operating years of the American base at Bluie West Eight at Kangerlussuaq, the lake was referred to as Lake Ferguson. The lake and the Roklubben Restaurant at its western shore are connected to Kangerlussuaq by a gravel road, one of the very few in Greenland. Tasersuatsiaq is a source of fresh water for Kangerlussuaq.

== Geography ==
The 2 kilometres (1.2 mi) by 6 kilometres (3.7 mi) lake is separated from the valleys of Qinnguata Kuussua and Akuliarusiarsuup Kuua, as well as the Kangerlussuaq settlement in the north by a low tundra ridge of Qaarsorsuaq. To the west lies the far end of the Kangerlussuaq Fjord. On the southern and eastern side, it is bounded by a vast highland of Ammalortup Nunaa, the original region artificially populated with 27 muskoxen.

Tasersuatsiaq is described of having a heavy wave action and a stony substrate. Tasersuatsiaq has an extensive abundance of kimberlite, with a diamond-favorable garnet site was discovered near the kimberlite system. The lake area is also known for having a nickel–norite belt, with potential of platinum and gold presence, in addition to nickel.

== Ecology ==
The bottom of the lake is covered with pondweed meadows. Several fly species are recorded at Tasersuatsiaq, including species of Heterotrissocladius, Psectrocladius, Chironomus, Paracladopelma, Micropsectra and Tanytarsus, for which its oxygen uptakes were researched.

In 2025, a research by the University of Maine Climate Change Institute reveals that Tasersuatsiaq had browned due to two months of record heat and precipitation in fall 2022, and may not be able to recover from the browning state.
