= Bernhardia (midge) =

Scientific classification
- Kingdom: Animalia
- Phylum: Arthropoda
- Class: Insecta
- Order: Diptera
- Family: Chironomidae
- Subfamily: Chironominae
- Tribe: Tanytarsini
- Genus: Bernhardia; Datta, 1992
- Species: B. unispinosa

Binomial name
- Bernhardia unispinosa Datta & Chaudhuri, 1992

Genus of non-biting midges

Bernhardia is a genus of nonbiting midges in the family Chironomidae. This genus has a single species, Bernhardia unispinosa.
