= Qinnguata Kuussua =

River in Greenland

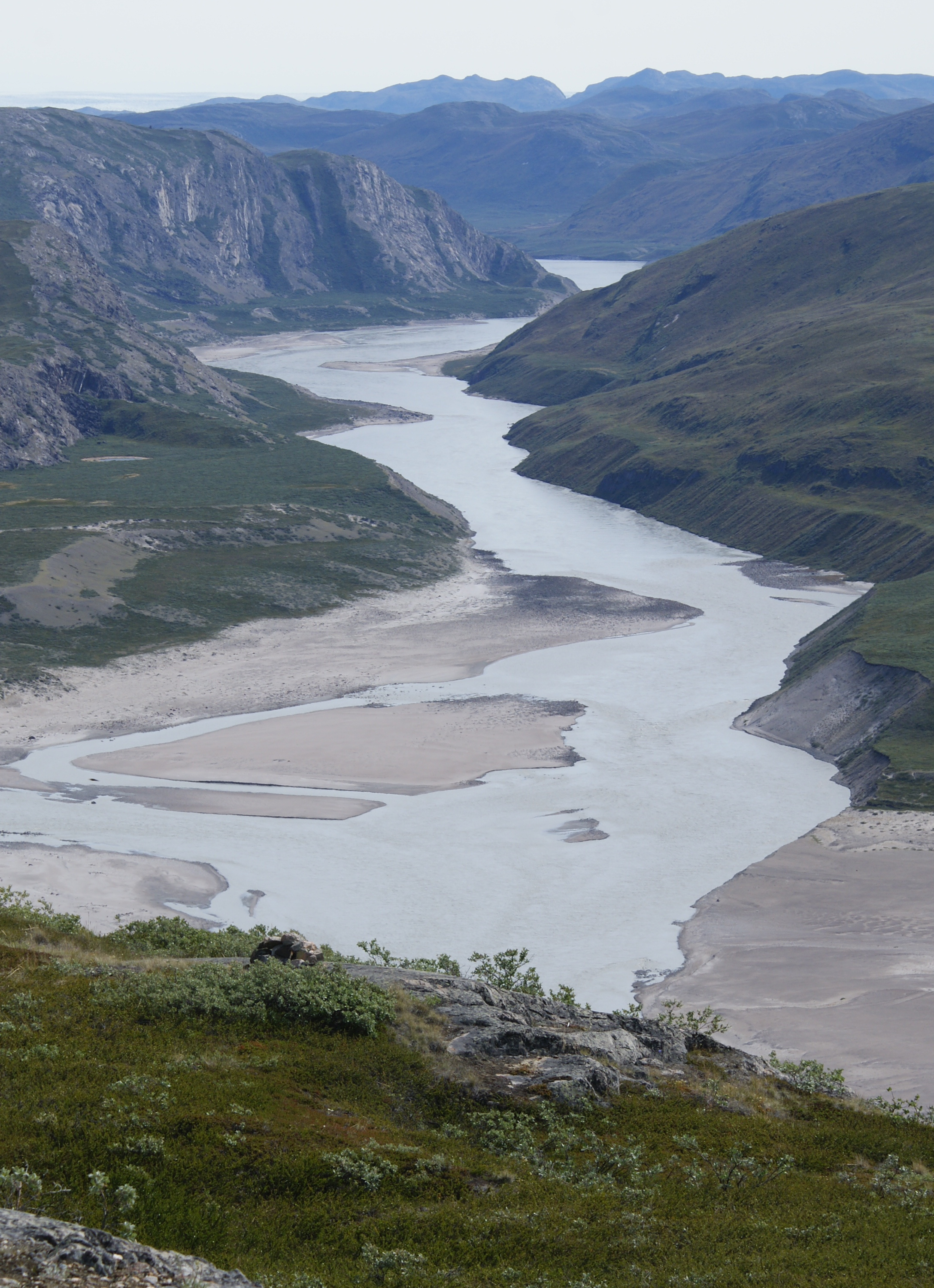
- Qinnguata Kuussua in its lower run, seen from Tarajornitsut

Location
- Country: Greenland

Physical characteristics
- Source
  - elevation: 100 m (330 ft)
- Mouth
  - location: Kangerlussuaq Fjord
  - coordinates: 67°0′20″N 50°18′00″W
  - elevation: 0 m (0 ft)
- Length: 31 km (19 mi)

Location within Greenland

Qinnguata Kuussua (lit. 'Big River at the Fjord Head') is a river in a valley of the same name in the Qeqqata municipality in central-western Greenland. Its sources are meltwater outflows from Russell Glacier and Leverett Glacier flowing from the Greenland Ice Sheet. It is the main river in the Kangerlussuaq area. For most of its run, the river is very wide, up to 2 km (1.2 mi) in the upper reaches. The climate is polar continental, with the area receiving very little rainfall.

== Geography ==
Several meltwater outflow streams from the southern base of the Russell Glacier (66°57′45″N 50°00′00″W) form the Qinnguata Kuussua river. The valley is 31 km (19 mi) long, oriented east-south-east to west-north-west. From the north it is bounded by an exposed, barren, and flattened ridge of Akuliarusiarsuk. From the south, the river valley is delimited by a sequence of tundra ranges, culminating in Tasersuatsiaap Kinginnera at 591 m (1,939 ft), and petering out near Kangerlussuaq in the form of a low, wide ridge of Qaarsorsuaq.

The lower part of the valley narrows down in the gorge between Akuliarusiarsuk ridge in the north, and Qaarsorsuaq ridge in the south, which separates the valley from lake Tasersuatsiaq and the Ammalortup Nunaa highland beyond.

== Tributaries ==
Its tributaries are the smaller Akuliarusiarsuup Kuua river − another, more northerly outflow from Russell Glacier - and the larger meltwater river sourced from Leverett Glacier. During the operating years of the American Bluie West Eight base at Kangerlussuaq, the lower part of the river flow past the confluence was referred to as Watson River. The confluence at 67°01′10″N 50°39′20″W forms a small sandur basin with large fields of glacial silt quicksand.

== Estuary ==
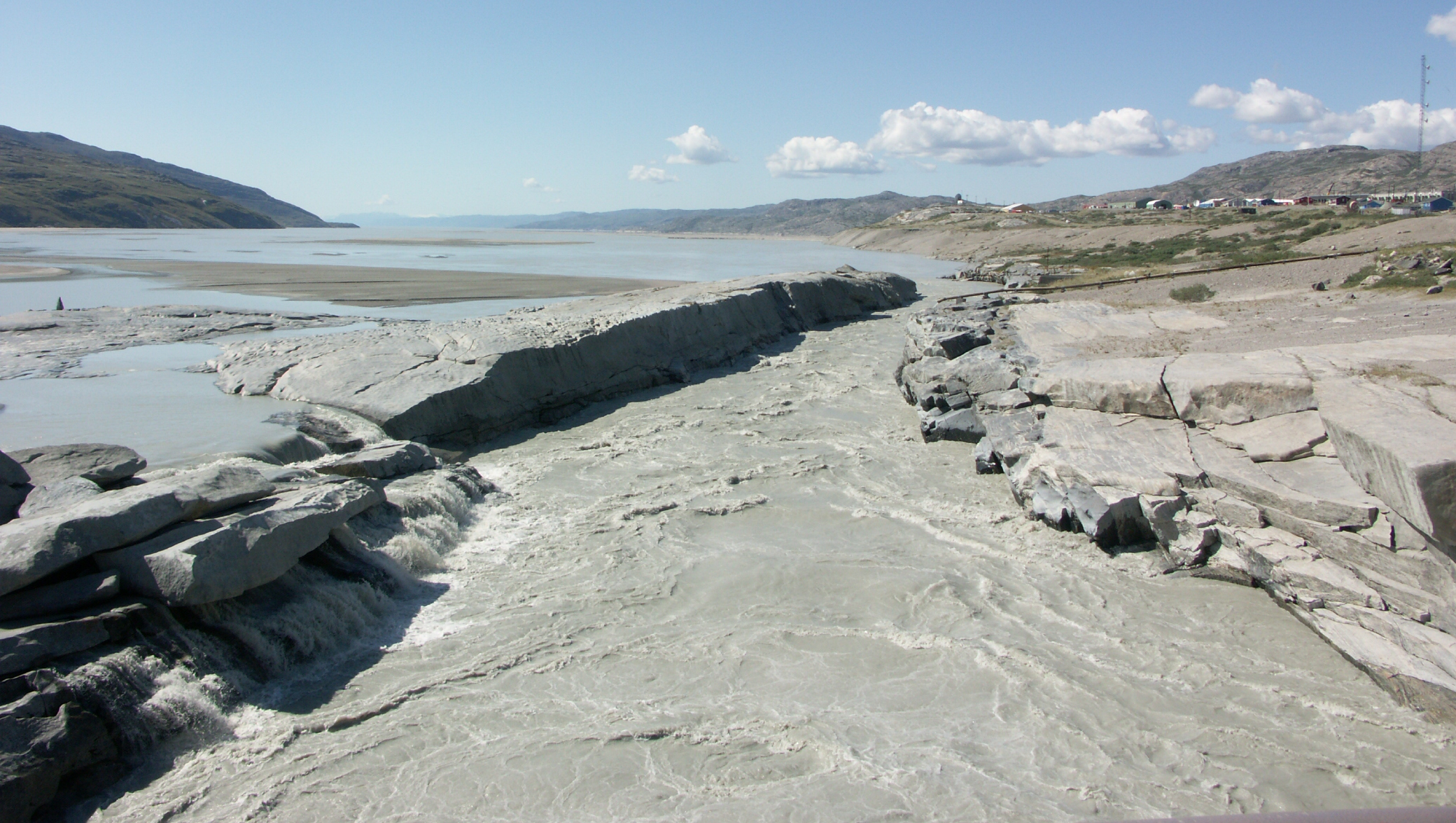
Estuary of Qinnguata Kuussua in Kangerlussuaq

The estuary of the river is very narrow, forcing its way through a rock barrier at high speed, discharging silt, which subsequently forms quicksand islet patches at the end of the Kangerlussuaq Fjord.

== Floods ==
The combined drainage basin of the Qinnguata Kuussua and Akuliarusiarsuup Kuua rivers, including the basin under the ice sheet, is 6,280 km^{2} (2,420 mi^{2}). The river is prone to flooding in the summer, sometimes significantly. On 31 August 2007 one of the temporary meltwater outflow lakes near Russell Glacier broke the ice barrier, emptying into the upper basin of the river, with the latter flooding the valley.
