= Tanytarsus reei =

Scientific classification
- Domain: Eukaryota
- Kingdom: Animalia
- Phylum: Arthropoda
- Class: Insecta
- Order: Diptera
- Family: Chironomidae
- Genus: Tanytarsus
- Species: T. reei

Binomial name
- Tanytarsus reei Na & Bae, 2010

Species of fly

Tanytarsus reei is a species of fly belonging to the family Chironomidae (non-biting midges). This is a rather small yellowish species with dark brown markings on the thorax, discovered close to Namyangju in South Korea. The specific name honours the Korean entomologist Han Il Ree.
