= Parapsectra =

Scientific classification
- Kingdom: Animalia
- Phylum: Arthropoda
- Class: Insecta
- Order: Diptera
- Family: Chironomidae
- Subfamily: Chironominae
- Tribe: Tanytarsini
- Genus: Parapsectra; Reiss, 1969

Genus of non-biting midges

Parapsectra is a genus of nonbiting midges in the family Chironomidae. There are about seven described species in Parapsectra, found mainly in Europe.

== Species ==
These seven species belong to the genus Parapsectra:

- Parapsectra bumasta Giłka & Jażdżewska, 2010
- Parapsectra chionophila (Edwards, 1933)
- Parapsectra mendli Reiss, 1983
- Parapsectra nana (Meigen, 1818)
- Parapsectra styriaca (Reiss, 1969)
- Parapsectra uliginosa Reiss, 1969
- Parapsectra wagneri Siebert, 1979
