= Cladotanytarsus =

Scientific classification
- Domain: Eukaryota
- Kingdom: Animalia
- Phylum: Arthropoda
- Class: Insecta
- Order: Diptera
- Family: Chironomidae
- Subfamily: Chironominae
- Tribe: Tanytarsini
- Genus: Cladotanytarsus; Kieffer, 1922

Type species
- Cladotanytarsus pallidus Kieffer, 1922

Subgenera
- Cladotanytarsus Kieffer, 1921; Lenziella

Synonyms
- Atanytarsus Zavrel, 1934; Lenziella Kieffer

Genus of non-biting midges

Cladotanytarsus is a genus of nonbiting midges in the family Chironomidae. There are more than 80 described species in Cladotanytarsus.

== Species ==
These species belong to the genus Cladotanytarsus:

- Cladotanytarsus acinatus Datta, Mazumdar & Chaudhuri, 1992
- Cladotanytarsus acornutus Jacobsen & Bily, 2007
- Cladotanytarsus acuticauda Kieffer, 1924
- Cladotanytarsus aduncus Mazumdar, Hazra & Chaudhuri, 2000
- Cladotanytarsus aegyptius Ghonaim, Ali & Amer, 2005
- Cladotanytarsus aeiparthenus Bilyj & Davies, 1989
- Cladotanytarsus amandus Hirvenoja, 1962
- Cladotanytarsus atridorsum Kieffer, 1924
- Cladotanytarsus australomancus Glover, 1973
- Cladotanytarsus bicornutus (Kieffer, 1922)
- Cladotanytarsus bilinearis Glover, 1973
- Cladotanytarsus bilyji Gilka & Puchalski
- Cladotanytarsus bisetus Wang & Guo, 2004
- Cladotanytarsus bukavus (Lehmann, 1979)
- Cladotanytarsus capensis (Freeman, 1954)
- Cladotanytarsus congolensis (Lehmann, 1979)
- Cladotanytarsus conversus (Johannsen, 1932)
- Cladotanytarsus crassus Giłka & Puchalski, 2018
- Cladotanytarsus crebrus Lehmann, 1981
- Cladotanytarsus crusculus (Saether, 1971)
- Cladotanytarsus cyrylae Giłka, 2001
- Cladotanytarsus daviesi Bilyj & Davies, 1989
- Cladotanytarsus difficilis Brundin, 1947
- Cladotanytarsus digitalis Wang & Zheng, 1993
- Cladotanytarsus dilatus Wang & Guo, 2004
- Cladotanytarsus dispersopilosus (Goetghebuer, 1935)
- Cladotanytarsus donnmcbeani Langton & McBean, 2011
- Cladotanytarsus ecristatus Reiss, 1991
- Cladotanytarsus elaensis Bilyj & Davies, 1989
- Cladotanytarsus flexus Datta, Mazumdar & Chaudhuri, 1992
- Cladotanytarsus frontalis Wang & Zheng, 1993
- Cladotanytarsus fulvofasciatus Kieffer, 1923
- Cladotanytarsus furcatus Freeman, 1961
- Cladotanytarsus fusiformis Bilyj & Davies, 1989
- Cladotanytarsus fustistylus Datta, Mazumdar & Chaudhuri, 1992
- Cladotanytarsus gedanicus Giłka, 2001
- Cladotanytarsus glaber Giłka & Puchalski, 2017
- Cladotanytarsus gloveri Chaudhuri & Guha, 1988
- Cladotanytarsus gracilistylus (Chaudhuri & Datta, 1992)
- Cladotanytarsus gurgitis Kieffer, 1925
- Cladotanytarsus hibaraoctavus Sasa, 1993
- Cladotanytarsus irsacus Lehmann, 1979
- Cladotanytarsus iucundus Hirvenoja, 1962
- Cladotanytarsus latissimus Giłka, 2011
- Cladotanytarsus lepidocalcar Krüger, 1938
- Cladotanytarsus lewisi (Freeman, 1950)
- Cladotanytarsus linearis (Freeman, 1954)
- Cladotanytarsus mancus (Walker, 1856)
- Cladotanytarsus marki Sublette, 1998
- Cladotanytarsus matthei Giłka, 2001
- Cladotanytarsus molestus Hirvenoja, 1962
- Cladotanytarsus multispinulus Guha & Chaudhuri, 1985
- Cladotanytarsus muricatus Bilyj & Davies, 1989
- Cladotanytarsus neovanderwulpi Ree, Jeong & Nam, 2011
- Cladotanytarsus nigrovittatus (Goetghebuer, 1922)
- Cladotanytarsus omanensis Cranston, 1989
- Cladotanytarsus ovatus Mazumdar, Hazra & Chaudhuri, 2000
- Cladotanytarsus pallidus Kieffer, 1922
- Cladotanytarsus palmatus Wang & Zheng, 1993
- Cladotanytarsus paratridorsum Wang & Guo, 2004
- Cladotanytarsus parvus Wang & Zheng, 1993
- Cladotanytarsus piniger Giłka, 2011
- Cladotanytarsus pinnaticornis Bilyj & Davies, 1989
- Cladotanytarsus pseudomancus (Goetghebuer, 1934)
- Cladotanytarsus reductus (Freeman, 1954)
- Cladotanytarsus saetheri Puchalski, Paasivirta & Giłka, 2018
- Cladotanytarsus sagittifer Giłka, 2009
- Cladotanytarsus sexdentatus (Chernovsky, 1949)
- Cladotanytarsus sinjongensis Ree & Kim, 1988
- Cladotanytarsus stylifer Giłka, 2015
- Cladotanytarsus subletteorum Giłka, 2011
- Cladotanytarsus tasmanicus Glover, 1973
- Cladotanytarsus teres Hirvenoja, 1962
- Cladotanytarsus tobaquardecimus Kikuchi & Sasa, 1990
- Cladotanytarsus tobaquindecimus Kikuchi & Sasa, 1990
- Cladotanytarsus tobasexdecimus Kikuchi & Sasa, 1990
- Cladotanytarsus tribelus Bilyj & Davies, 1989
- Cladotanytarsus tusimajekeus Sasa & Suzuki, 1999
- Cladotanytarsus unilinearis Glover, 1973
- Cladotanytarsus utonaiquartus (Sasa, 1988)
- Cladotanytarsus vanderwulpi (Edwards, 1929)
- Cladotanytarsus verbosus Mazumdar, Hazra & Chaudhuri, 2000
- Cladotanytarsus viridiventris (Malloch, 1915)
- Cladotanytarsus yunnanensis Wang & Zheng, 1990
