= Stempellinella =

Scientific classification
- Kingdom: Animalia
- Phylum: Arthropoda
- Class: Insecta
- Order: Diptera
- Family: Chironomidae
- Subfamily: Chironominae
- Tribe: Tanytarsini
- Genus: Stempellinella; Brundin, 1947

Genus of non-biting midges

Stempellinella is a genus of nonbiting midges in the family Chironomidae. There are more than 20 described species in Stempellinella.

== Species ==
These 25 species belong to the genus Stempellinella:

- Stempellinella apicula Guo & Wang, 2005
- Stempellinella boltoni Ekrem, 2007
- Stempellinella brevilamellae Guo & Wang, 2005
- Stempellinella brevis (Edwards, 1929)
- Stempellinella coronata Inoue, Kawai & Imabayashi, 2004
- Stempellinella cuneipennis (Edwards, 1929)
- Stempellinella depilisa Guo & Wang, 2007
- Stempellinella distincta Ekrem, 2007
- Stempellinella edwardsi Spies & Saether, 2004
- Stempellinella fimbriata Ekrem, 2007
- Stempellinella flavidula (Edwards, 1929)
- Stempellinella inopinata (Botnariuc & Cândea-Cure, 1954)
- Stempellinella lamellata Ekrem, 2007
- Stempellinella minor (Edwards, 1929)
- Stempellinella reissi Casas, 1991
- Stempellinella saltuum (Goetghebuer)
- Stempellinella sofiae (Fusari & Lamas, 2014)
- Stempellinella sublettorum Ekrem, 2007
- Stempellinella tamaseptima (Sasa, 1980)
- † Stempellinella bicorna Seredszus & Wichard, 2007
- † Stempellinella electra Giłka & Zakrzewska, 2015
- † Stempellinella fibra Giłka, Zakrzewska & Krzemiński, 2016
- † Stempellinella gilkai Zakrzewska & Jankowska, 2021
- † Stempellinella ivanovae Gilka & Zakrzewska, 2014
- † Stempellinella pollex Giłka & Zakrzewska, 2020
