= Corynocera =

Scientific classification
- Domain: Eukaryota
- Kingdom: Animalia
- Phylum: Arthropoda
- Class: Insecta
- Order: Diptera
- Family: Chironomidae
- Subfamily: Chironominae
- Tribe: Tanytarsini
- Genus: Corynocera; J.W.Zetterstedt, 1837

Synonyms
- Drydotanytarsus Søgaard Andersen, 1943; Uralia Lipina, 1939

Genus of non-biting midges

Corynocera is a genus of nonbiting midges in the family Chironomidae. There are about five described species in Corynocera.

== Species ==
These five species belong to the genus Corynocera:

- Corynocera ambigua Zetterstedt, 1838
- Corynocera brachyptera Linevich, 1962
- Corynocera oliveri Lindeberg, 1970
- Corynocera sevanica (Chernovsky, 1949)
- † Corynocera duffi (Deevey, 1955)
