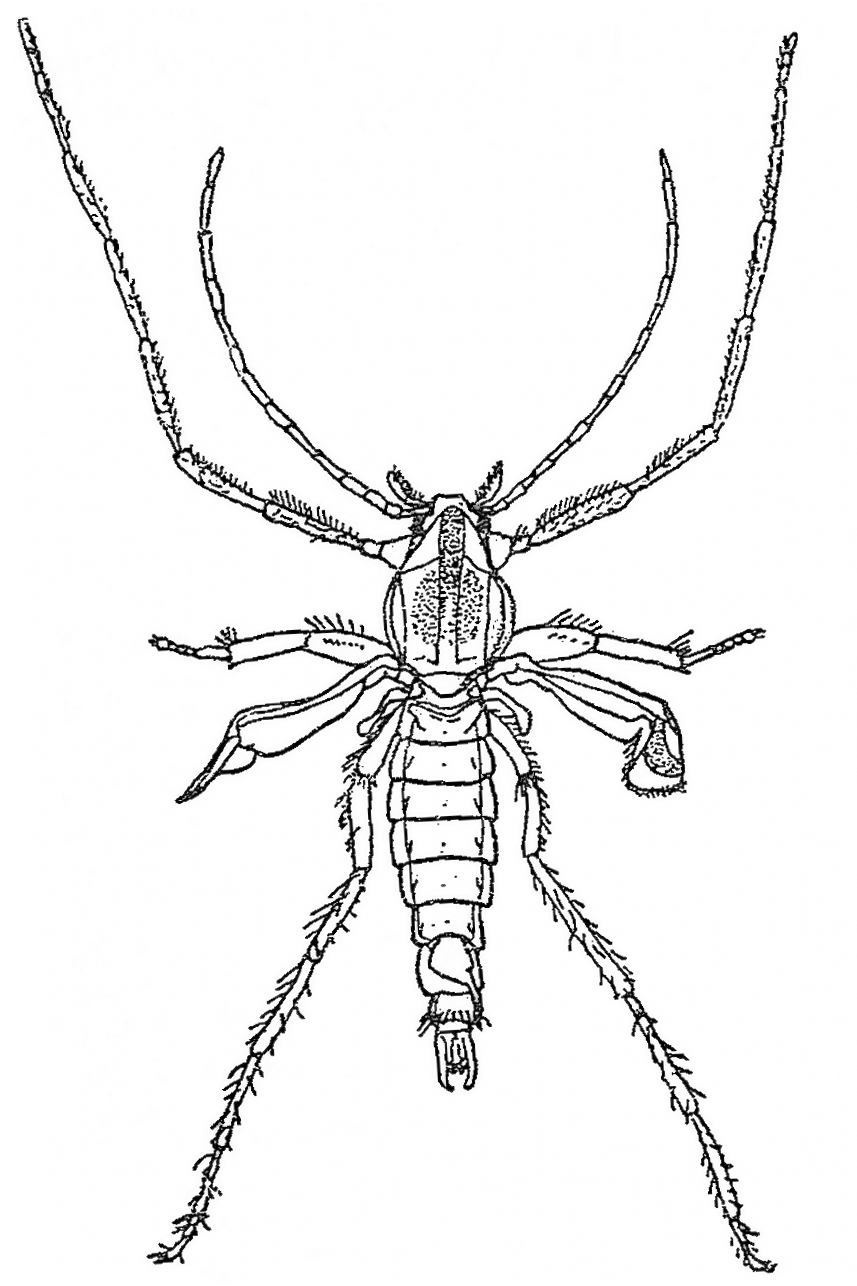
- Male Pontomyia natans

Scientific classification
- Kingdom: Animalia
- Phylum: Arthropoda
- Clade: Pancrustacea
- Class: Insecta
- Order: Diptera
- Family: Chironomidae
- Subfamily: Chironominae
- Tribe: Tanytarsini
- Genus: Pontomyia; Edwards, 1926

Species
- Pontomyia natans Edwards, 1926; (= Pontomyia cottoni Womersley, 1937); Pontomyia oceana Tokunaga, 1964; Pontomyia pacifica Tokunaga, 1932

= Pontomyia =

Genus of flies

Pontomyia is a genus of flightless marine midges belonging to the subfamily Chironominae in the Chironomidae family. They are known from the island shorelines of the Indian, Atlantic and Pacific Oceans. Insects in marine environments are extremely rare, and this genus possesses a combination of flightlessness, extreme sexual dimorphism, and an extremely short adult life span (of less than 3 hours).

The genus was described by Frederick Wallace Edwards in 1926 from Samoa. They were originally described as being submarine midges. Four species were described in the genus P. natans (Edward 1924), P. cottoni (Wormersley 1937), P. pacifica (Tokunaga 1964), and P. oceana (Tokunaga 1964) but DNA analysis determined that P. cottoni was not distinguishable from P. natans. Larvae from Puerto Rico were found to be close enough to P. natans based on DNA sequences. This suggests that species in the genus are capable of being dispersed widely across oceans. Algae attached to sea turtles have been found carrying Pontomyia larvae and this form of hitch-hiking can potentially serve as means of dispersal.

P. natans is widely distributed around the Indian and Pacific Oceans and its life history is slightly better known than other species. The adults live less than three hours long with males dying shortly after mating and females after laying eggs (semelparity). Males have long antennae with the mid legs short and tipped in claws. The stubby wings are used like oars to swim at the surface of sea-water. The females are larviform, without wings or functional legs. The eggs are laid in coils in rockpools where they sink to the bottom. The larvae feed on algae and marine vegetation. Adult emergence is linked to lunar cycles, mainly at low tide, and midges are attracted to lights.

Pontomyia is notable for their unique adaptation to oceanic environments, where adults live only a few hours and complete their life cycle on the sea surface. The genus, including P. oceana described by Tokunaga, has been the focus of extensive study by marine entomologist Lanna Cheng, who clarified the morphology, behavior, and ecological adaptations of these rare marine insects.
