= Lanna Cheng =

Singaporean-American marine scientist

Lanna Cheng is a marine scientist known for her research on marine insects, particularly the sea-skater genus Halobates. Cheng has had a long career at the Scripps Institution of Oceanography, University of California, San Diego (SIO-UCSD), where she contributed to research in marine biology, oceanography, climate-change and plastic pollution. She holds the title of Research Scientist Emeritus at Scripps.

She also discovered the unique micro-hair layer in Halobates which protects them from drowning and allows respiration during submergence (1973).

== Early life, education ==
She grew up in Singapore and was educated in Chinese through elementary and high school at the Singapore Nanyang Girls' High School. Cheng completed her Bachelor of Science (B.Sc.) at the University of Singapore in 1963, followed by a B.Sc. Hons. in 1964 and a Master of Science (M.Sc.) in 1966. She was awarded a D.Phil. from Oxford University, U.K. in 1969, and was a postdoctoral research/teaching fellow at the University of Waterloo, Ontario, Canada in 1969.

During her time at the University of Oxford, she served as President of the Oxford University Malaysian-Singapore Association (1967–1968). She was elected a fellow of the Royal Entomological Society (FRES) in 1966.

She was elected President of the Western Society of Naturalists (1985–1986) and served as a member of the Editorial Board of the Chinese Journal of Oceanology and Limnology (2001–2008), She was invited to serve as the Editor of Marine Insects for the World Register of Marine Species (WoRMS), a position she held from 2009 to 2024.

== Career ==
Cheng joined the Scripps Institution of Oceanography in 1970 as an Assistant Research Biologist where she began research on marine insects and focused on the biology and ecology of Halobates, the only insect genus able to live at the sea-air interface of open oceans as a member of the pleuston community.

She was promoted to research biologist in 1997. Over her career, Cheng led and participated in many oceanographic and biological expeditions including the Sea-skater I Expedition to Baja California, Mexico in 1975, and the Sea-skater II Expedition to the Galapagos Islands, Ecuador in 1978.

She also organized several International Prochlorophyte Expeditions in Koror, Palau between 1979 and 1988 and participated in the Oxford University Biological Expedition to the Seychelles in 1985, as well as research expeditions to Japan, the Bahamas, Eastern Tropical Pacific Ocean, Xishuangbanna in Yunnan, China, and one leg of the oceanographic cruise in celebration of Charles Darwin's Voyage of the Beagle from Tahiti to Sydney in 2010.

Cheng retired in 2012 and was re-appointed a Research Scientist Emeritus at SIO, retaining her academic privileges and office space, while continuing collaborative research projects, mostly with colleagues at the National University of Singapore, the King Abdullah University of Science and Technology and various other scientific institutions.

== Research ==
Her research has focused on understanding how insects, a predominantly terrestrial and aerial group, have adapted to the open-ocean environment. She carried out short-term experimental studies on Halobates on oceanographic expeditions and made extensive collections of Halobates and other marine insects which were deposited at the Invertebrate Collection at Scripps Oceanography, the Lee Kong Chian Natural History Museum at the National University of Singapore, The British Museum and The Natural History Museum of Denmark.

Cheng's research has helped illuminate how ocean skater populations respond to plastic pollution, which provides ovipositon substrates, and oceanic currents and historical climate events. Phylogenetic studies of three oceanic Halobates species revealed that their population expansions coincided with the formation of major currents in the eastern Pacific, explaining species-specific distribution patterns and adaptations. Her rediscovery of a long-lost marine midge Pontomyia with one of the shortest adult lifespans among insects in the Enewetak Atoll of the Marshall Islands in 1975 revived scientific interest in the species, which had not been studied in detail since a brief Japanese report in 1932.

Cheng later co-authored, with Danwei Huang, the first systematic review of the genus in 2011. Their study proposed that the species' evolutionary divergence dates back 11 to 26 million years, possibly originating before the formation of Taiwan and dispersing by "island-hopping" on floating debris, offering novel insights into insect biogeography and marine dispersal mechanisms. A complete phylogeny of the Pontomyia co-authored with Danwei Huang and Peter Cranston was published in Invertebrate Systematics in 2014.

Her findings have been published in some 150 peer-reviewed journals. She edited the foundational book on Marine Insects (1976).
