= Neozavrelia =

Scientific classification
- Kingdom: Animalia
- Phylum: Arthropoda
- Class: Insecta
- Order: Diptera
- Family: Chironomidae
- Subfamily: Chironominae
- Tribe: Tanytarsini
- Genus: Neozavrelia; Goetghebuer, 1941

Type species
- Neozavrelia luteola Goetghebuer & Thienemann, 1941

Genus of non-biting midges

Neozavrelia is a genus of nonbiting midges in the family Chironomidae. There are more than 30 described species in Neozavrelia.

== Distribution ==
They are found worldwide, excluding Africa and the Neotropical geographical regions.

== Species ==
These 36 species belong to the genus Neozavrelia:

- Neozavrelia bernensis Reiss, 1968
- Neozavrelia bicoliocula (Tokunaga, 1938)
- Neozavrelia bowmani Cranston, 1998
- Neozavrelia fengchengensis Wang & Wang, 1996
- Neozavrelia fuldensis Fittkau, 1954
- Neozavrelia improvisa Fittkau, 1954
- Neozavrelia jintuundecima Sasa, 1996
- Neozavrelia kedrovaya Orel, 2021
- Neozavrelia kibunensis (Tokunaga, 1938)
- Neozavrelia kuzmychikha Orel, 2021
- Neozavrelia lindbergi Reiss, 1968
- Neozavrelia longappendiculata Albu, 1980
- Neozavrelia longivolsella Guo & Wang, 2005
- Neozavrelia luteola Goetghebuer & Thienemann, 1941
- Neozavrelia minuta (Linevich, 1963)
- Neozavrelia mongolensis Reiss, 1971
- Neozavrelia nadezhdae Orel, 2021
- Neozavrelia nudalus Cranston, 1989
- Neozavrelia okadai (Tokunaga, 1939)
- Neozavrelia oligomera Wang & Zheng, 1990
- Neozavrelia optoputealis Cranston, 1998
- Neozavrelia oyabeparvulus (Sasa, Kawai & Ueno, 1988)
- Neozavrelia paramushirica Orel, 2021
- Neozavrelia pilosa Guo & Wang, 2005
- Neozavrelia samarga Orel, 2021
- Neozavrelia saudiarabica Cranston, 1989
- Neozavrelia shoualba Sasa, 1989
- Neozavrelia simantolemea (Sasa, Suzuki & Sakai, 1998)
- Neozavrelia simantomenea (Sasa, Suzuki & Sakai, 1998)
- Neozavrelia spina Guo & Wang, 2005
- Neozavrelia tamanona (Sasa, 1980)
- Neozavrelia tusimajekea (Sasa & Suzuki, 1999)
- Neozavrelia tygda Orel, 2021
- Neozavrelia yakuefea (Sasa & Suzuki, 2000)
- Neozavrelia yakufegea (Sasa & Suzuki, 2000)
- Neozavrelia zarya Orel, 2021
