= Stempellina =

Scientific classification
- Kingdom: Animalia
- Phylum: Arthropoda
- Class: Insecta
- Order: Diptera
- Family: Chironomidae
- Subfamily: Chironominae
- Tribe: Tanytarsini
- Genus: Stempellina; Thienemann & Bause, 1913

Synonyms
- Parastempellina Brundin, 1947

Genus of non-biting midges

Stempellina is a genus of nonbiting midges in the family Chironomidae. There are more than 20 described species in Stempellina.

== Species ==
These 26 species belong to the genus Stempellina:

- Stempellina almi Brundin, 1947
- Stempellina australiensis Freeman, 1961
- Stempellina bausei Bause
- Stempellina bazovae Orel, 2023
- Stempellina chambiensis (Goetghebuer, 1935)
- Stempellina ciliaris Goetghebuer, 1944
- Stempellina clavata Guo & Wang, 2004
- Stempellina cornuta Kieffer, 1922
- Stempellina cururui Säwedal, 1984
- Stempellina fasciata Kieffer, 1922
- Stempellina gressitti (Tokunaga, 1964)
- Stempellina johannsenii (Thienemann & Bause, 1913)
- Stempellina johni Glover, 1973
- Stempellina leptocelloides Webb, 1969
- Stempellina ministylus Ree, 2015
- Stempellina radoszkowskii Giłka & Gadawski, 2022
- Stempellina ranota Webb, 1969
- Stempellina reissi Lehmann, 1981
- Stempellina rodesta Webb, 1969
- Stempellina stebnerae Giłka & Zakrzewska, 2020
- Stempellina subglabripennis (Brundin, 1947)
- Stempellina tarumai Säwedal, 1984
- Stempellina tervolae Giłka, 2005
- Stempellina truncata Freeman, 1958
- † Stempellina exigua Seredszus & Wichard, 2007
- † Stempellina stebneri Giłka & Zakrzewska, 2020
