= Constempellina =

Scientific classification
- Kingdom: Animalia
- Phylum: Arthropoda
- Class: Insecta
- Order: Diptera
- Family: Chironomidae
- Subfamily: Chironominae
- Tribe: Tanytarsini
- Genus: Constempellina; Brundin, 1947

Genus of non-biting midges

Constempellina is a genus of non-biting midges in the subfamily Chironominae of the bloodworm family Chironomidae.

== Species ==
These species are members of the genus Constempellina.

- Constempellina bita Pankratova, 1983
- Constempellina brevicosta (Edwards, 1937)
- Constempellina tokunagai Zorina, 2013
