= Paratanytarsus =

Scientific classification
- Kingdom: Animalia
- Phylum: Arthropoda
- Class: Insecta
- Order: Diptera
- Family: Chironomidae
- Subfamily: Chironominae
- Tribe: Tanytarsini
- Genus: Paratanytarsus; Thienemann & Bause, 1913

Subgenera
- Lundstroemia; Tanytarsus; Tetratanytarsus

Synonyms
- Monotanytarsus Kieffer, 1921; Stylotanytarsus Kieffer, 1921; Tomotanytarsus Kieffer, 1922

Genus of non-biting midges

Paratanytarsus is a genus of nonbiting midges in the family Chironomidae. There are more than 80 described species in Paratanytarsus.

== Species ==
These 84 species belong to the genus Paratanytarsus:

- Paratanytarsus abiskoensis Reiss, 1981
- Paratanytarsus albus Chaudhuri, Guha & Ghosh, 1985
- Paratanytarsus argentiniensis Kieffer, 1925
- Paratanytarsus atrolabiatus (Birula, 1936)
- Paratanytarsus austriacus (Kieffer, 1924)
- Paratanytarsus baikalensis (Chernovsky, 1949)
- Paratanytarsus bausellus Kieffer, 1922
- Paratanytarsus bilobatus (Kieffer, 1922)
- Paratanytarsus bituberculatus (Edwards, 1929)
- Paratanytarsus biwatertius Sasa & Kawai, 1987
- Paratanytarsus boiemicus Kieffer, 1922
- Paratanytarsus brevicalcar (Kieffer, 1909)
- Paratanytarsus capucinus (Kieffer, 1922)
- Paratanytarsus chlorogyne (Goetghebuer & Lenz, 1938)
- Paratanytarsus confusus Palmén, 1960
- Paratanytarsus corbii Trivinho-Strixino, 2010
- Paratanytarsus corsicanus Moubayed-Breil, Ashe & Langton, 2012
- Paratanytarsus curvispinus Moubayed-Breil, Ashe & Langton, 2012
- Paratanytarsus dimorphis Reiss, 1965
- Paratanytarsus dissimilis (Johannsen, 1905)
- Paratanytarsus diversidens (Birula, 1936)
- Paratanytarsus dubius (Malloch, 1915)
- Paratanytarsus fontinalis Moubayed-Breil & Ashe, 2015
- Paratanytarsus furvus Glover, 1973
- Paratanytarsus grimmii (Schneider, 1885)
- Paratanytarsus haisooni Ree & Jeong, 2010
- Paratanytarsus hyperboreus Brundin, 1949
- Paratanytarsus inawaprimus Sasa, 1993
- Paratanytarsus inopertus (Walker, 1856)
- Paratanytarsus inquilinus (Krüger, 1941)
- Paratanytarsus intricatus (Goetghebuer, 1921)
- Paratanytarsus jefferyi Glover, 1973
- Paratanytarsus karica (Birula, 1936)
- Paratanytarsus kaszabi Reiss, 1971
- Paratanytarsus kathleenae Glover, 1973
- Paratanytarsus kiefferianus (Goetghebuer & Lenz, 1938)
- Paratanytarsus koreanus Reiss, 1981
- Paratanytarsus kuramacircus Sasa, 1989
- Paratanytarsus kuramascircus Sasa, 1998
- Paratanytarsus laccophilus (Edwards, 1929)
- Paratanytarsus laetipes (Zetterstedt, 1850)
- Paratanytarsus lauterborni (Kieffer, 1909)
- Paratanytarsus lobatus (Kieffer, 1924)
- Paratanytarsus longistilus Bolton, Ekrem, Sublette & Sublette, 2010
- Paratanytarsus luteola (Goetghebuer, 1950)
- Paratanytarsus mediterraneus Reiss, 1981
- Paratanytarsus miikesecundus (Sasa, 1985)
- Paratanytarsus mirificus Giłka, 2015
- Paratanytarsus modicus (Skuse, 1889)
- Paratanytarsus nanuensis Li & Tang, 2020
- Paratanytarsus nanyuensis Li & Tang, 2021
- Paratanytarsus natvigi (Goetghebuer, 1933
- Paratanytarsus oconnori Moubayed-Breil, Ashe & Langton, 2012
- Paratanytarsus pallidus (Kieffer, 1922)
- Paratanytarsus paludum (Goetghebuer, 1939)
- Paratanytarsus papillatus Datta & Chaudhuri, 1992
- Paratanytarsus paralaccophilus Gilka & Paasivirta, 2006
- Paratanytarsus paralauterborni Wang & Guo, 2005
- Paratanytarsus paramikesecundus Ree, Jeong & Nam, 2011
- Paratanytarsus parthenogeneticus (Freeman, 1961)
- Paratanytarsus penicillatus (Goetghebuer, 1928)
- Paratanytarsus perlevis (Walker, 1856)
- Paratanytarsus petschoricus (Birula, 1936)
- Paratanytarsus praecellens Giłka, 2009
- Paratanytarsus quintuplex Kieffer, 1922
- Paratanytarsus setosimanus (Goetghebuer, 1933)
- Paratanytarsus shofukuquindecimus Sasa, 1998
- Paratanytarsus silentii Trivinho-Strixino, 2010
- Paratanytarsus similatus (Malloch, 1915)
- Paratanytarsus similis (Goetghebuer, 1928)
- Paratanytarsus sinensis Guha & Chaudhuri, 1984
- Paratanytarsus stagnarius (Tokunaga, 1938)
- Paratanytarsus tamanegi Sasa, 1983
- Paratanytarsus telmatophilus (Tokunaga, 1938)
- Paratanytarsus tenellulus (Goetghebuer, 1921)
- Paratanytarsus tenuis (Meigen, 1830)
- Paratanytarsus tolucensis Reiss, 1972
- Paratanytarsus toyaprimus Sasa, 1988
- Paratanytarsus tredecemarticulum (Tokunaga, 1938)
- Paratanytarsus trilobatus (Kieffer, 1921)
- Paratanytarsus tyrolensis (Kieffer, 1924)
- Paratanytarsus unicolor Kieffer, 1922
- Paratanytarsus viridellus (Kieffer, 1924)
- Paratanytarsus zengensis Li & Tang, 2021
