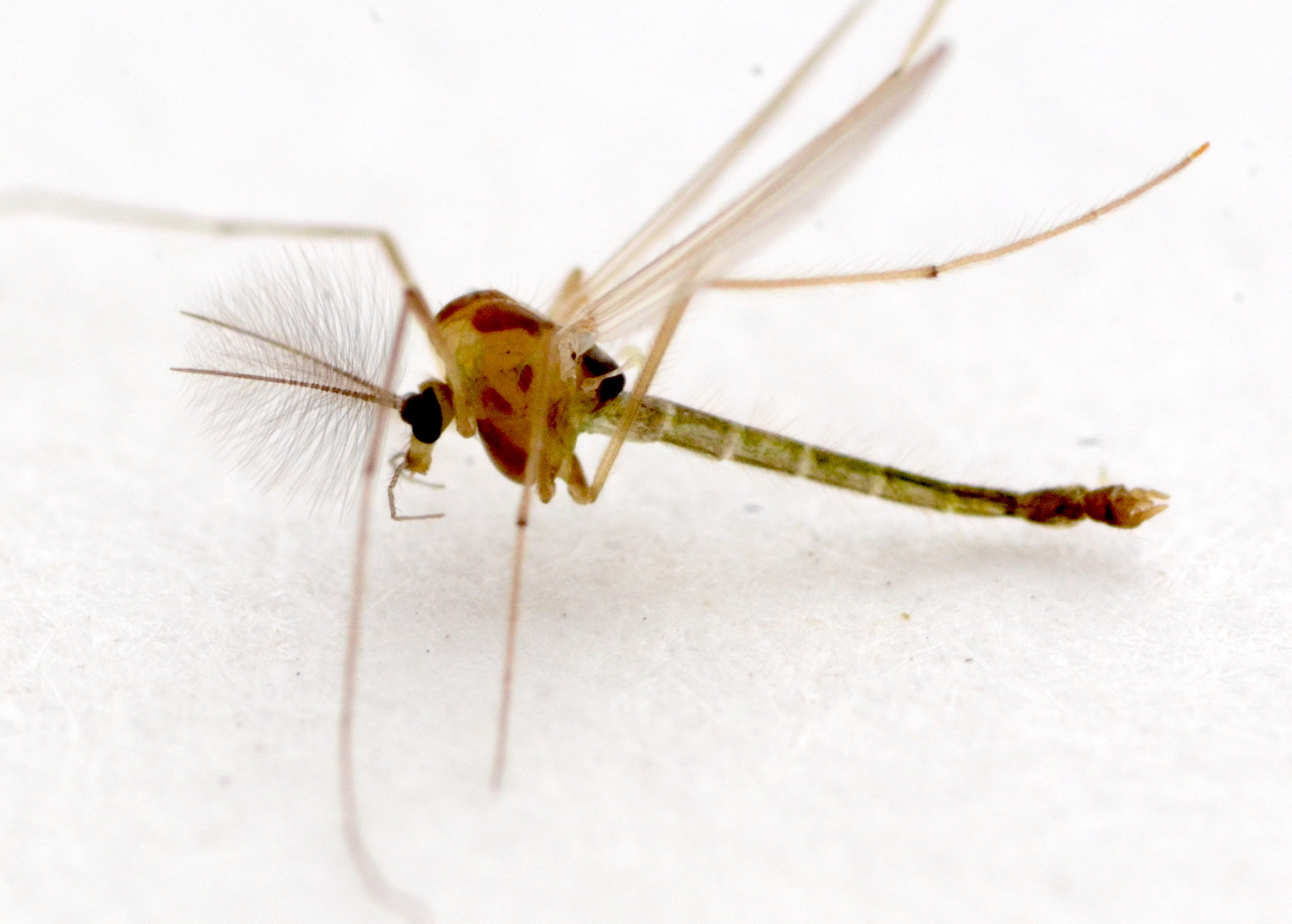
- Micropsectra polita

Scientific classification
- Kingdom: Animalia
- Phylum: Arthropoda
- Class: Insecta
- Order: Diptera
- Family: Chironomidae
- Subfamily: Chironominae
- Tribe: Tanytarsini
- Genus: Micropsectra; Kieffer, 1909

Subgenera
- Eutanytarsus; Micropsectra Kieffer, 1909; Tanytarsus; Tetratanytarsus

Synonyms
- Eutanytarsus Thienemann, 1913; Gowiniella Thienemann, 1950; Lauterbornia Kieffer, 1911; Lundstroemia Kieffer, 1921; Oeklandia Kieffer, 1922; Syntanytarsus Thienemann, 1913

= Micropsectra =

Genus of non-biting midges

Micropsectra is a genus of midges in the family Chironomidae. There are more than 170 described species in Micropsectra.

== Species ==
These 172 species belong to the genus Micropsectra:

- Micropsectra akagiprima Kikuchi & Sasa, 1994
- Micropsectra albifasciata (Hardy, 1960)
- Micropsectra alyssae Moubayed-Breil & Ashe, 2018
- Micropsectra analis (Kieffer, 1922)
- Micropsectra andalusiaca Marcuzzi, 1950
- Micropsectra angorensis Kieffer, 1918
- Micropsectra appendica Stur & Ekrem, 2006
- Micropsectra apposita (Walker, 1856)
- Micropsectra arduinna Moubayed-Breil, 2018
- Micropsectra aristata Pinder, 1976
- Micropsectra atitlanensis Sublette & Sasa, 1994
- Micropsectra atrofasciata (Kieffer, 1911)
- Micropsectra attenuata Reiss, 1969
- Micropsectra auvergnensis Reiss, 1969
- Micropsectra baishanzua Wang, 1995
- Micropsectra barbatimana Kieffer, 1922
- Micropsectra bavarica Stur & Ekrem, 2006
- Micropsectra bidentata (Goetghebuer, 1921)
- Micropsectra bodanica Reiss, 1969
- Micropsectra borealis (Kieffer, 1922)
- Micropsectra brundini Sawedal, 1979
- Micropsectra bryanti Hardy, 1960
- Micropsectra calcifontis Stur & Ekrem, 2006
- Micropsectra candida Chaudhuri & Datta, 1991
- Micropsectra capicola Freeman, 1955
- Micropsectra chlorophila (Kieffer, 1922)
- Micropsectra chuzelonga Sasa, 1984
- Micropsectra chuzenotescens Sasa, 1984
- Micropsectra chuzeprima Sasa, 1984
- Micropsectra clastrieri Reiss, 1969
- Micropsectra clava Chaudhuri, Guha & Ghosh, 1985
- Micropsectra confundenda (Kieffer, 1911)
- Micropsectra connexa (Kieffer, 1906)
- Micropsectra contracta Reiss, 1965
- Micropsectra curtimanus Kieffer, 1924
- Micropsectra curvicornis Chernovsky, 1949
- Micropsectra daisenensis (Tokunaga, 1938)
- Micropsectra davigra Giłka, 2006
- Micropsectra deflecta (Johannsen, 1905)
- Micropsectra diceras (Kieffer, 1922)
- Micropsectra dives (Johannsen, 1905)
- Micropsectra dubia (Malloch)
- Micropsectra ekremi Moubayed-Breil & Ashe, 2018
- Micropsectra excisa (Kieffer, 1911)
- Micropsectra exsecta (Kieffer, 1911)
- Micropsectra fossarum (Tokunaga, 1938)
- Micropsectra franzi Goetghebuer, 1949
- Micropsectra freyi Storå, 1945
- Micropsectra fusca (Meigen, 1804)
- Micropsectra geminata Oliver & Dillon, 1994
- Micropsectra globulifera (Goetghebuer, 1921)
- Micropsectra gracelis
- Micropsectra groenlandica Andersen, 1937
- Micropsectra gunmasecunda Sasa & Wakai, 1996
- Micropsectra hawaiiensis Hardy, 1960
- Micropsectra heptameris Kieffer, 1925
- Micropsectra hidakabecea Sasa & Suzuki, 2000
- Micropsectra hortensis (Kieffer, 1913)
- Micropsectra hydra (Kieffer, 1913)
- Micropsectra imicola (Kieffer, 1913)
- Micropsectra inamenea Sasa, Kitami & Suzuki, 2001
- Micropsectra inaneoa Sasa, Kitami & Suzuki, 2001
- Micropsectra insignilobus Kieffer, 1924
- Micropsectra interilobus Kieffer, 1924
- Micropsectra intrudens (Walker, 1856)
- Micropsectra janetscheki Reiss, 1971
- Micropsectra joganplumosa Sasa & Okazawa, 1991
- Micropsectra johanaprima Sasa & Okazawa, 1994
- Micropsectra jokaquarta Sasa & Ogata, 1999
- Micropsectra jokatertia Sasa & Ogata, 1999
- Micropsectra jokatertius Sasa & Ogata, 1999
- Micropsectra junci (Meigen, 1818)
- Micropsectra kaalae Hardy, 1960
- Micropsectra kamisecunda Sasa & Okazawa, 1991
- Micropsectra klinki Stur & Ekrem, 2006
- Micropsectra koreana Ree, 1992
- Micropsectra kurobeconvexa Sasa & Okazawa, 1992
- Micropsectra kurobemaculata Sasa & Okazawa, 1992
- Micropsectra kurobeprima Sasa & Okazawa, 1992
- Micropsectra kurobesecunda Sasa & Okazawa, 1992
- Micropsectra lacteiclava (Grimshaw, 1901)
- Micropsectra lacustris Säwedal, 1975
- Micropsectra lanceolata (Kieffer, 1911)
- Micropsectra latifasciata (Hardy, 1960)
- Micropsectra latifrons (Kieffer, 1925)
- Micropsectra lincki (Kieffer, 1911)
- Micropsectra lindebergi Säwedal, 1976
- Micropsectra lindrothi Goetghebuer, 1931
- Micropsectra lobata Kieffer, 1924
- Micropsectra lobatifrons Botanriuc
- Micropsectra logani (Johannsen, 1928)
- Micropsectra longicrista Stur & Ekrem, 2006
- Micropsectra longimanus (Kieffer, 1909)
- Micropsectra longiradius (Kieffer, 1911)
- Micropsectra longitarsis (Zetterstedt, 1838)
- Micropsectra malla Giłka & Paasivirta, 2008
- Micropsectra miki Marcuzzi, 1950
- Micropsectra mongolmeneus Sasa & Suzuki, 1997
- Micropsectra montana Säwedal, 1976
- Micropsectra monticola (Hardy, 1960)
- Micropsectra nakaokii Sasa, Kawai & Ueno, 1988
- Micropsectra neoappendica Anderson, Stur & Ekrem, 2013
- Micropsectra nepalensis Säwedal, 1976
- Micropsectra nigripila (Johannsen, 1905)
- Micropsectra nigrofasciata Kieffer, 1922
- Micropsectra notescens (Walker, 1856)
- Micropsectra nuzetertia Sasa, 1996
- Micropsectra oberaarensis Stur & Ekrem, 2008
- Micropsectra oksanaae Moubayed-Breil & Ashe, 2018
- Micropsectra pallida Goetghebuer, 1949
- Micropsectra pallidula (Meigen, 1830)
- Micropsectra paralaccophilus Giłka & Paasivirta, 2008
- Micropsectra paraniger Giłka & Paasivirta, 2008
- Micropsectra parasofiae
- Micropsectra paucisetosa Wang & Zhang, 1996
- Micropsectra penicillata Anderson, Stur & Ekrem, 2013
- Micropsectra pharetrophora Fittkau & Reiss, 1999
- Micropsectra pilgeru Kieffer, 1922
- Micropsectra polita (Malloch, 1919)
- Micropsectra praticola (Kieffer, 1911)
- Micropsectra proximalis Goetghebuer, 1942
- Micropsectra quadriloba Kieffer, 1922
- Micropsectra quinaria Kieffer, 1925
- Micropsectra radialis Goetghebuer, 1939
- Micropsectra recurvata Goetghebuer, 1928
- Micropsectra rilensis Giłka, 2001
- Micropsectra robusta Stur & Ekrem, 2006
- Micropsectra roseiventris (Kieffer, 1909)
- Micropsectra rufofasciata Kieffer, 1922
- Micropsectra scandinaviae (Thienemann & Kieffer, 1916)
- Micropsectra schrankelae Stur & Ekrem, 2006
- Micropsectra sedna (Oliver, 1976)
- Micropsectra seguyi Casas & Laville, 1990
- Micropsectra semivillosa (Goetghebuer, 1923)
- Micropsectra serrata Reiss, 1989
- Micropsectra sexannulata (Goetghebuer, 1921)
- Micropsectra shinaensis (Tokunaga, 1940)
- Micropsectra shoubrevis Sasa & Okazawa, 1991
- Micropsectra shouelegans Sasa, 1989
- Micropsectra shouharasima Sasa, 1989
- Micropsectra shouhiemalis Sasa, 1989
- Micropsectra silvesterae Langton, 1999
- Micropsectra sofiae Stur & Ekrem, 2006
- Micropsectra solitaria Goetghebuer, 1949
- Micropsectra spinigera Reiss, 1995
- Micropsectra subletteorum Anderson, Stur & Ekrem, 2013
- Micropsectra sublettorum Anderson, Stur & Ekrem, 2013
- Micropsectra subnitens Goetghebuer, 1928
- Micropsectra suecica (Thienemann & Kieffer, 1916)
- Micropsectra taiwana (Tokunaga, 1939)
- Micropsectra tamaprima Sasa, 1980
- Micropsectra togacontralia Sasa & Okazawa, 1991
- Micropsectra tomoprima Sasa, 1993
- Micropsectra tori Sawedal, 1981
- Micropsectra toyamaefeus Sasa, 1996
- Micropsectra tricrenata Kieffer, 1925
- Micropsectra tuberosa Reiss, 1968
- Micropsectra tusimakelea Sasa & Suzuki, 1999
- Micropsectra tusimaneoa Sasa & Suzuki, 1999
- Micropsectra tusimaopea Sasa & Suzuki, 1999
- Micropsectra tusimapequea Sasa & Suzuki, 1999
- Micropsectra tusimaresea Sasa & Suzuki, 1999
- Micropsectra utonaitertia Sasa, 1988
- Micropsectra uva Gilka, Zakrzewska, Baranov & Dominiak, 2013
- Micropsectra vernalis (Goetghebuer, 1931)
- Micropsectra viridscutellata Goetghebuer, 1931
- Micropsectra xantha (Roback, 1955)
- Micropsectra yunoprima Sasa, 1984
- Micropsectra zernyi Marcuzzi, 1950
