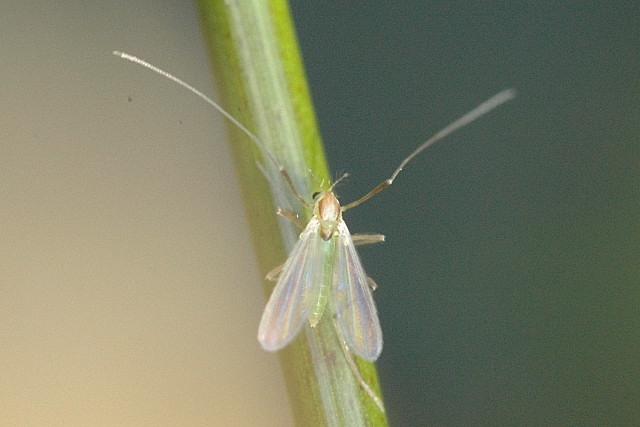
- Tanytarsus sp. male

Scientific classification
- Domain: Eukaryota
- Kingdom: Animalia
- Phylum: Arthropoda
- Class: Insecta
- Order: Diptera
- Family: Chironomidae
- Subfamily: Chironominae
- Tribe: Tanytarsini; Zavrel 1917

= Tanytarsini =

Tribe of non-biting midges

Tanytarsini is a tribe of nonbiting midges in the family Chironomidae. There are more than 20 genera and 1,000 described species in Tanytarsini.

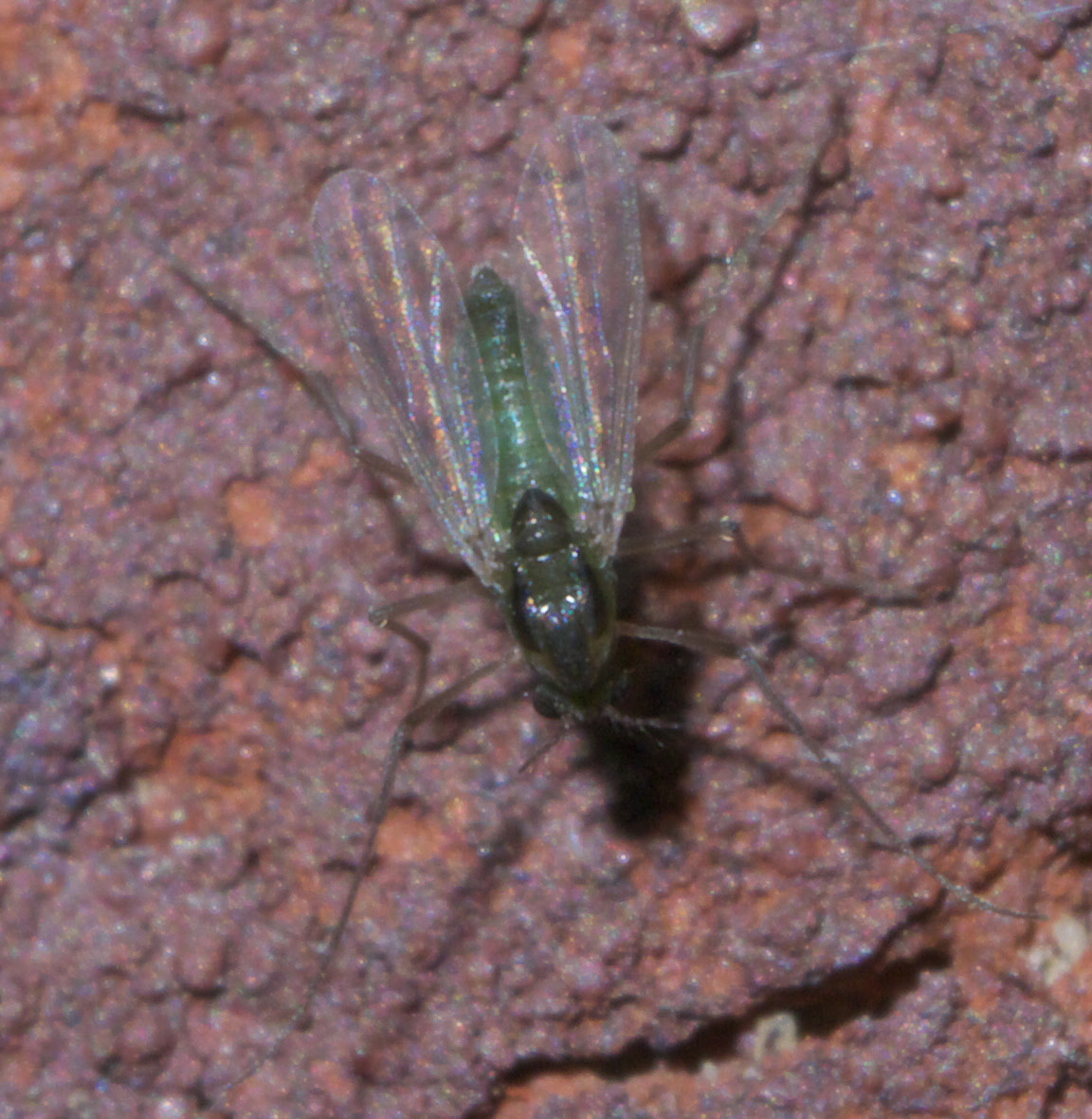
Tanytarsini

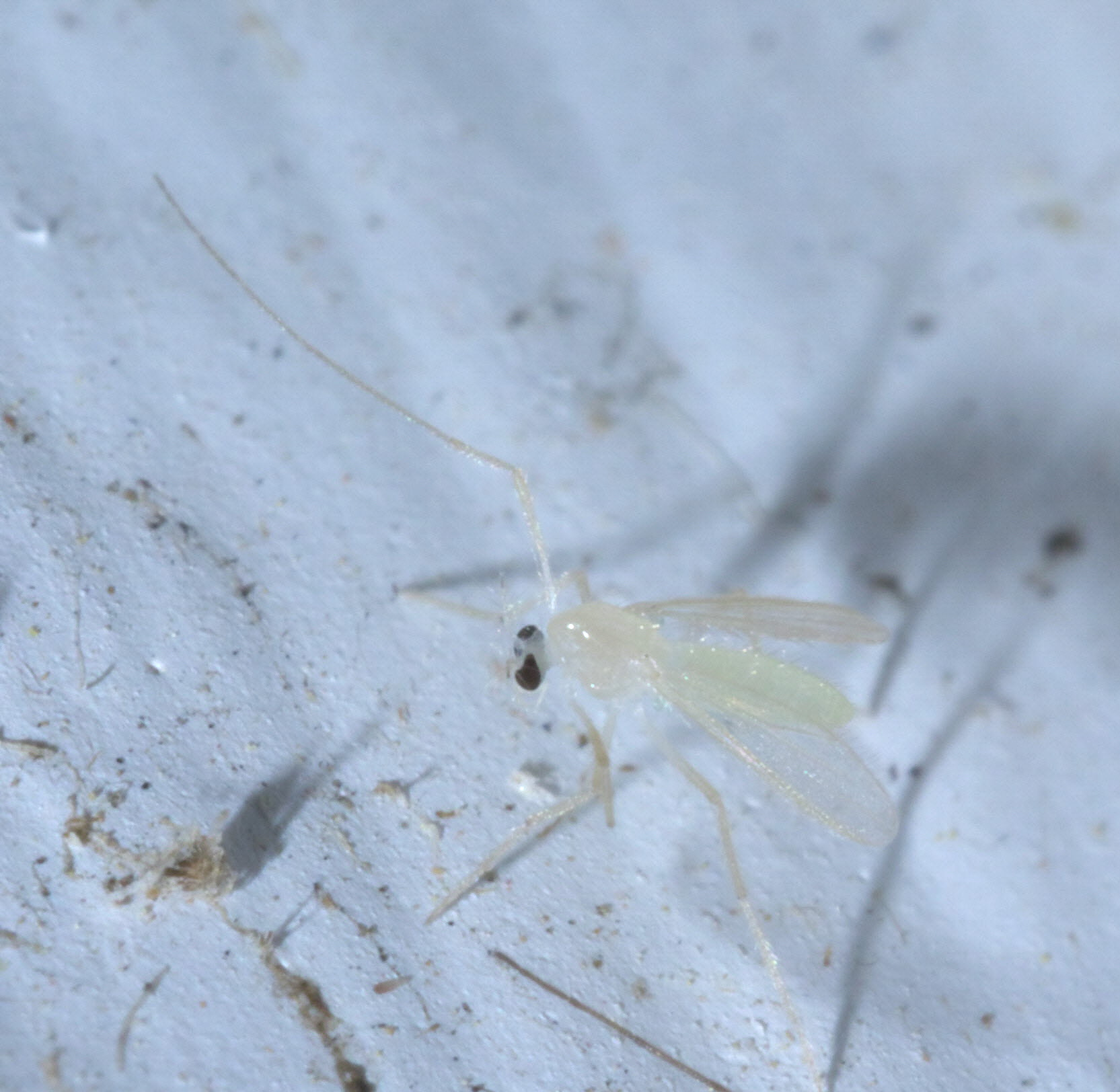
Tanytarsini

== Genera ==
These 26 genera belong to the tribe Tanytarsini:

- Afrozavrelia Harrison, 2004
- Bernhardia Datta, 1992
- Biwatendipes Tokunaga, 1965
- Cladotanytarsus Kieffer, 1921
- Constempellina Brundin, 1947
- Corynocera Zetterstedt, 1837
- Friederia Saether & Andersen, 1998
- Gujaratomyia Giłka & Zakrzewska, 2018
- Himatendipes Tokunaga, 1959
- Krenopsectra Reiss, 1969
- Lithotanytarsus Thienemann, 1933
- Micropsectra Kieffer, 1909
- Neozavrelia Goetghebuer, 1941
- Parapsectra Reiss, 1969
- Paratanytarsus Thienemann & Bause, 1913
- Pontomyia Edwards, 1926
- Stempellina Thienemann & Bause 1913
- Stempellinella Brundin, 1947
- Sublettea Roback, 1975
- Tanytarsus Wulp, 1874
- Thienemanniola Kieffer, 1921
- Yaetanytarsus Sasa, 1990
- Zavrelia Kieffer, 1913
- † Archistempellina Giłka & Zakrzewska, 2013
- † Corneliola Giłka & Zakrzewska, 2013
- † Potamoceroides Munier-Chalmas, 1901
