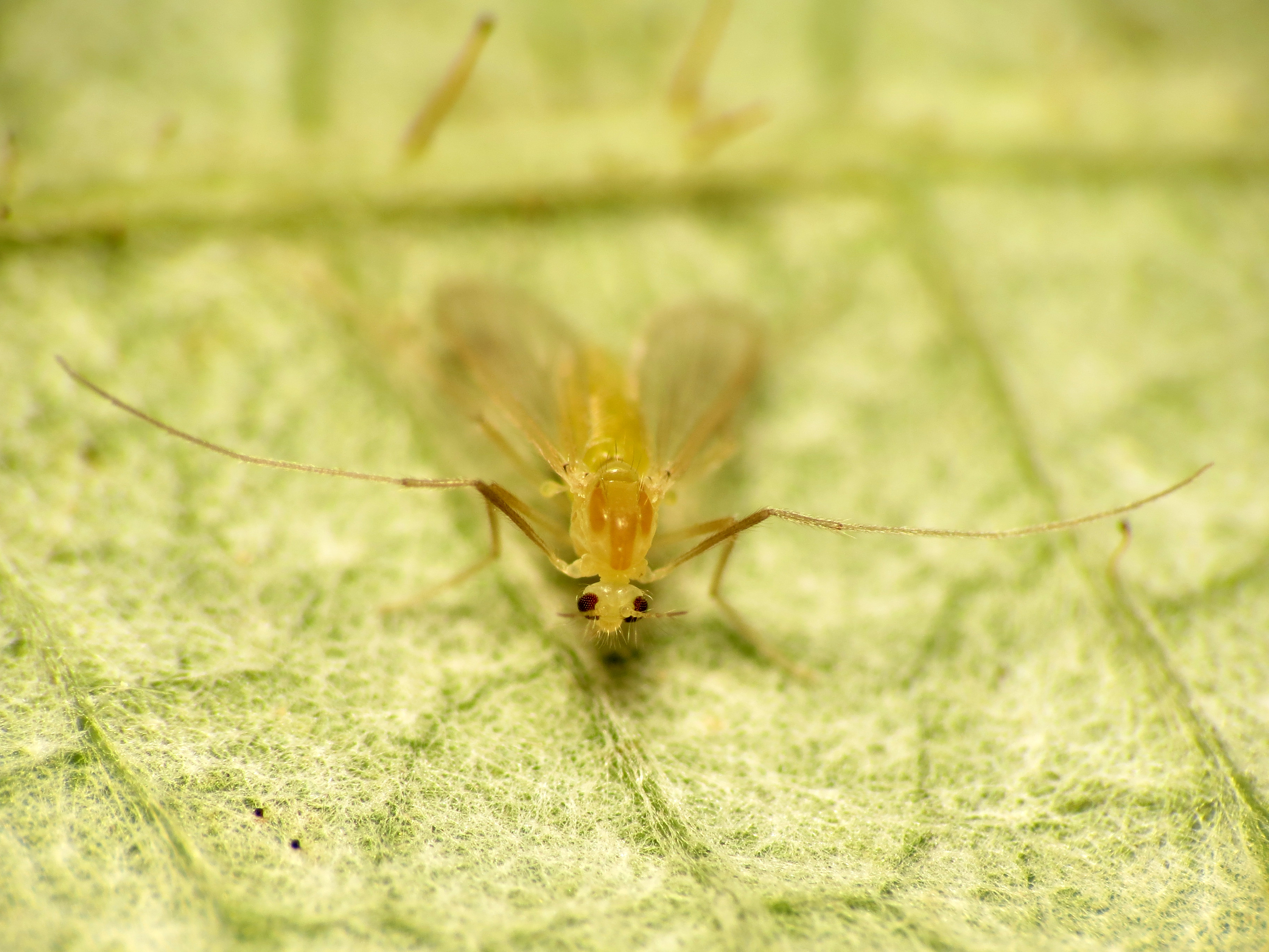
- Tanytarsus sp.

Scientific classification
- Kingdom: Animalia
- Phylum: Arthropoda
- Class: Insecta
- Order: Diptera
- Family: Chironomidae
- Subfamily: Chironominae
- Tribe: Tanytarsini
- Genus: Tanytarsus van der Wulp, 1874

= Tanytarsus =

Genus of flies

Tanytarsus is a large genus of non-biting midges of the tribe Tanytarsini and subfamily Chironominae of the bloodworm family (Chironomidae). The larvae of these insects occur in a wide range of freshwater habitats with some species being marine.

In older literature the name Tanytarsus was used for some members of tribe Chironomini related to the genus Phaenopsectra.

== Species ==
There are more than 480 described species in Tanytarsus.

- Tanytarsus abdominalis (Staeger, 1839)
- Tanytarsus aberrans Lindeberg, 1970
- Tanytarsus abnormis Lehmann, 1981
- Tanytarsus aboensis (Harrison, 2004)
- Tanytarsus acifer Ekrem, Sublette & Sublette, 2003
- Tanytarsus aculeatus Brundin, 1949
- Tanytarsus acuminatus Kieffer, 1926
- Tanytarsus adalberti (Säwedal, 1981)
- Tanytarsus adustus Lin, Stur & Ekrem, 2018
- Tanytarsus africanus Kieffer, 1913
- Tanytarsus ahyoni Ree & Jeong, 2010
- Tanytarsus aigos Ekrem, Sublette & Sublette, 2003
- Tanytarsus akantertius Sasa & Kamimura, 1987
- Tanytarsus alaidae Trivinho-Strixino & Shimabukuro, 2017
- Tanytarsus alata Paggi, 1992
- Tanytarsus albanyensis Forsyth, 1971
- Tanytarsus albipennis Kieffer, 1925
- Tanytarsus albiradix (Kieffer, 1923)
- Tanytarsus albisutus Santos Abreu, 1918
- Tanytarsus alienus Trivinho-Strixino & Shimabukuro, 2017
- Tanytarsus allicis Sublette, 1964
- Tanytarsus amazonicus Sanseverino & Fittkau, 2006
- Tanytarsus anderseni Fittkau & Reiss, 1971
- Tanytarsus angelae Trivinho-Strixino & Shimabukuro, 2017
- Tanytarsus angulatus Kawai, 1991
- Tanytarsus angustus Freeman, 1955
- Tanytarsus ankasaensis Ekrem, 2001
- Tanytarsus ansatus (Reiss, 1984)
- Tanytarsus apenninicus Rossaro, 1993
- Tanytarsus apicalis Kieffer, 1913
- Tanytarsus appendiculatus Ekrem, Sublette & Sublette, 2003
- Tanytarsus aquavolans Butler, 2000
- Tanytarsus arduennensis Goetghebuer, 1922
- Tanytarsus argaensis Singh & Kulshrestha, 1976
- Tanytarsus aries Dantas, Hamada & Giłka, 2023
- Tanytarsus armatifrons Kieffer, 1916
- Tanytarsus atagoensis Tokunaga, 1938
- Tanytarsus aterrimus Freeman, 1954
- Tanytarsus atomarius Kieffer, 1918
- Tanytarsus atrocinctus Goetghebuer, 1936
- Tanytarsus atronotatus Kieffer, 1922
- Tanytarsus aviungulatus Glover, 1973
- Tanytarsus awashensis Harrison, 2004
- Tanytarsus balteatus Freeman, 1955
- Tanytarsus barbitarsis Freeman, 1961
- Tanytarsus bathophilus Kieffer, 1911
- Tanytarsus bathyryptus Kieffer, 1925
- Tanytarsus bayi Ekrem, Sublette & Sublette, 2003
- Tanytarsus becki Ekrem, Sublette & Sublette, 2003
- Tanytarsus belairensis Glover, 1973
- Tanytarsus belmorensis Glover, 1973
- Tanytarsus bifurcus Freeman, 1958
- Tanytarsus bigibbosus Kieffer, 1921
- Tanytarsus bilineatus Kieffer, 1906
- Tanytarsus bipunctatus Kieffer, 1922
- Tanytarsus bispinosus Freeman, 1961
- Tanytarsus biwatrifurcus Sasa & Kawai, 1987
- Tanytarsus boltoni Ekrem, Sublette & Sublette, 2003
- Tanytarsus brachyopsis Kieffer, 1913
- Tanytarsus branquini Fittkau & Reiss, 1973
- Tanytarsus breda (Roback, 1960)
- Tanytarsus brevioricornis Kieffer, 1922
- Tanytarsus briani Reís, Gil-Azevedo & Ferreira-Keppler, 2021
- Tanytarsus bromelicola Cranston, 2007
- Tanytarsus brundini Lindeberg, 1963
- Tanytarsus buchonius Reiss, 1971
- Tanytarsus buckleyi Sublette, 1964
- Tanytarsus caipira Trivinho-Strixino & Strixino, 2007
- Tanytarsus calorifontis Ekrem, 2002
- Tanytarsus candidus Kieffer, 1925
- Tanytarsus capitatus Sublette & Sasa, 1994
- Tanytarsus capucinus (Kieffer, 1925)
- Tanytarsus castelnaui (Säwedal, 1981)
- Tanytarsus centesimus Dantas & Giłka, 2024
- Tanytarsus challeti Spies, 1998
- Tanytarsus chicomendesi Dantas, Hamada & Giłka, 2023
- Tanytarsus chinyensis Goetghebuer, 1934
- Tanytarsus chloris Ekrem, Sublette & Sublette, 2003
- Tanytarsus chlorogaster (Kieffer, 1918)
- Tanytarsus chubetuefeus Sasa & Suzuki, 2001
- Tanytarsus chuzesecundus Sasa, 1984
- Tanytarsus ciliatus Kieffer, 1918
- Tanytarsus clavatus Kieffer, 1922
- Tanytarsus clivosus Reiss, 1972
- Tanytarsus collessi Glover, 1973
- Tanytarsus colombiensis Dantas, Amat, Hamada & Giłka, 2022
- Tanytarsus commoni Glover, 1973
- Tanytarsus communis Skuse, 1889
- Tanytarsus confusus Malloch, 1915
- Tanytarsus congus Lehmann, 1981
- Tanytarsus contractipalpis Kieffer, 1925
- Tanytarsus cordiformis Kieffer, 1925
- Tanytarsus corumba Trivinho-Strixino, Wiedenbrug & Silva, 2015
- Tanytarsus costarica Reís, Gil-Azevedo & Ferreira-Keppler, 2021
- Tanytarsus cretensis Reiss, 1987
- Tanytarsus cristatus Chaudhuri & Datta, 1992
- Tanytarsus cuieirensis Fittkau & Reiss, 1973
- Tanytarsus curticornis Kieffer, 1922
- Tanytarsus curtimanus Kieffer, 1911
- Tanytarsus cururui Fittkau & Reiss, 1973
- Tanytarsus curvicristatus Contreras-Lichtenberg, 1988
- Tanytarsus daitoopeus Sasa & Suzuki, 2001
- Tanytarsus daitopequeus Sasa & Suzuki, 2001
- Tanytarsus danicus (Wulp, 1875)
- Tanytarsus debilis (Meigen, 1830)
- Tanytarsus deimos Giłka, Dantas & Andersen, 2024
- Tanytarsus dendyi Sublette, 1964
- Tanytarsus desertor Giłka & Paasivirta, 2007
- Tanytarsus dibranchius Kieffer, 1926
- Tanytarsus digitatus Sanseverino & Fittkau, 2006
- Tanytarsus dispar Thienemann, 1929
- Tanytarsus dissimilis Johannsen, 1905
- Tanytarsus distans Kieffer, 1916
- Tanytarsus dollfusi Goetghebuer, 1938
- Tanytarsus dostinei Cranston, 2000
- Tanytarsus edwardi Glover, 1973
- Tanytarsus ejuncidus (Walker, 1856)
- Tanytarsus elisabethae Ekrem, 2001
- Tanytarsus eminulus (Walker, 1856)
- Tanytarsus epleri Ekrem, Sublette & Sublette, 2003
- Tanytarsus excavatus Edwards, 1929
- Tanytarsus faeroensis Kieffer, 1915
- Tanytarsus fasciculus Chaudhuri & Mazumdar, 1998
- Tanytarsus fastigatus Reiss, 1972
- Tanytarsus fatigans Johannsen, 1905
- Tanytarsus femineus (Kieffer, 1922)
- Tanytarsus fennicus Lindeberg, 1970
- Tanytarsus flavellus Zetterstedt, 1838
- Tanytarsus flaviradialis Guha & Chaudhuri, 1985
- Tanytarsus flavoviridis Kieffer, 1922
- Tanytarsus flexistilus Freeman, 1958
- Tanytarsus flumineus Harrison, 2004
- Tanytarsus formosae (Kieffer, 1921)
- Tanytarsus formosanus Kieffer, 1912
- Tanytarsus frameatus Dantas, Hamada & Giłka, 2023
- Tanytarsus friburgensis Sanseverino & Fittkau, 2006
- Tanytarsus friederi (Trivinho-Strixino & Strixino, 2000)
- Tanytarsus fulvonotatus Kieffer, 1922
- Tanytarsus funebris Freeman, 1959
- Tanytarsus fuscithorax Skuse, 1889
- Tanytarsus germani Dantas, Amat, Hamada & Giłka, 2022
- Tanytarsus gianii Moubayed-Breil, 1989
- Tanytarsus gibbifer Kieffer, 1922
- Tanytarsus gibbosiceps Kieffer, 1922
- Tanytarsus gibbosifrons Kieffer, 1922
- Tanytarsus gibbus Ekrem, Sublette & Sublette, 2003
- Tanytarsus ginzanjekeus Sasa & Suzuki, 2001
- Tanytarsus ginzankeleus Sasa & Suzuki, 2001
- Tanytarsus ginzanleleus Yamamoto & Yamamoto, 2014
- Tanytarsus ginzanlemeus Sasa & Suzuki, 2001
- Tanytarsus glabrescens Edwards, 1929
- Tanytarsus gnomon Dantas, Amat, Hamada & Giłka, 2022
- Tanytarsus gotodeeus Sasa & Suzuki, 2000
- Tanytarsus gracilentus Holmgren, 1883
- Tanytarsus graniticus Glover, 1973
- Tanytarsus gregarius Kieffer, 1909
- Tanytarsus guatemalensis Sublette & Sasa, 1994
- Tanytarsus guerlus (Roback, 1957)
- Tanytarsus gulungul Cranston, 2000
- Tanytarsus hajifissus Kawai, Okamoto & Imabayashi, 2002
- Tanytarsus hamatus Reiss, 1972
- Tanytarsus hardwicki Cranston, 2000
- Tanytarsus harei Ekrem, 2001
- Tanytarsus harperi Ekrem, Sublette & Sublette, 2003
- Tanytarsus hastatus Sublette & Sasa, 1994
- Tanytarsus haugheyi Glover, 1973
- Tanytarsus heberti Lin, Stur & Ekrem, 2018
- Tanytarsus heliomesonyctios Langton, 1999
- Tanytarsus herrmanni Ekrem, Sublette & Sublette, 2003
- Tanytarsus heusdensis Goetghebuer, 1923
- Tanytarsus hilarellus (Zetterstedt, 1838)
- Tanytarsus hirsutus Trivinho-Strixino, Wiedenbrug & Silva, 2015
- Tanytarsus hjulorum Ekrem & Stur, 2007
- Tanytarsus hopkinsi Edwards, 1928
- Tanytarsus hulensis Kugler, 1973
- Tanytarsus humboldti (Säwedal, 1981)
- Tanytarsus humphreyi Cranston, 2000
- Tanytarsus ikicedeus Sasa & Suzuki, 1999
- Tanytarsus ikideeus Sasa & Suzuki, 1999
- Tanytarsus illustris Dantas & Giłka, 2017
- Tanytarsus impar Trivinho-Strixino & Strixino, 2004
- Tanytarsus inaequalis Goetghebuer, 1921
- Tanytarsus inaopeus Sasa, Kitami & Suzuki, 2001
- Tanytarsus inapequeus Sasa, Kitami & Suzuki, 2001
- Tanytarsus inawaijeus Sasa, Kitami & Suzuki, 2000
- Tanytarsus inawajekeus Sasa, Kitami & Suzuki, 2000
- Tanytarsus inawakeleus Sasa, Kitami & Suzuki, 2000
- Tanytarsus inextentus Skuse, 1889
- Tanytarsus infundibulus Chaudhuri & Datta, 1992
- Tanytarsus innarensis Brundin, 1947
- Tanytarsus insgnis Dantas & Giłka, 2017
- Tanytarsus insolens Dantas & Giłka, 2017
- Tanytarsus insulicola Tokunaga, 1964
- Tanytarsus insulus Mazumdar, 1998
- Tanytarsus ipei Maheshwari, 1987
- Tanytarsus iriolemeus Sasa & Suzuki, 2000
- Tanytarsus islandicus Goetghebuer & Lindroth, 1931
- Tanytarsus itsae Ghonaim, 2005
- Tanytarsus jacaretingensis Sanseverino, 2006
- Tanytarsus jatai Trivinho-Strixino, Wiedenbrug & Silva, 2015
- Tanytarsus kakumensis Ekrem, 1999
- Tanytarsus kamimurai Sasa & Suzuki, 1998
- Tanytarsus kaxinawa Dantas, Hamada & Giłka, 2023
- Tanytarsus khandariensis Singh & Kulshrestha, 1976
- Tanytarsus kharaensis Zorina & Zinchenko, 2009
- Tanytarsus kiche Vinogradova, Riss & Spies, 2009
- Tanytarsus kikuchii Sasa, Kawai & Ueno, 1988
- Tanytarsus kirai Sasa & Kawai, 1987
- Tanytarsus kiseogi Ree & Jeong, 2010
- Tanytarsus kitaokinawanus Sasa & Hasegawa, 1988
- Tanytarsus konishii Sasa & Kawai, 1985
- Tanytarsus kraussi (Säwedal, 1981)
- Tanytarsus lactescens Edwards, 1929
- Tanytarsus lapponicus Lindeberg, 1970
- Tanytarsus latiforceps Edwards, 1941
- Tanytarsus latifrons Kieffer, 1922
- Tanytarsus lestagei Goetghebuer, 1922
- Tanytarsus liepae Glover, 1973
- Tanytarsus ligulatus Reiss, 1972
- Tanytarsus limicola Kieffer, 1922
- Tanytarsus limneticus Sublette, 1964
- Tanytarsus lindneri Goetghebuer, 1942
- Tanytarsus littoralis Kieffer, 1925
- Tanytarsus lobiger Ekrem, Sublette & Sublette, 2003
- Tanytarsus longitarsis Kieffer, 1911
- Tanytarsus longitubuli Trivinho-Strixino, Wiedenbrug & Silva, 2015
- Tanytarsus luctuosus Freeman, 1958
- Tanytarsus lugens (Thienemann & Kieffer, 1916)
- Tanytarsus lulu Dantas, Amat, Hamada & Giłka, 2022
- Tanytarsus madeiraensis Lin, Stur & Ekrem, 2018
- Tanytarsus magnifrons Kieffer, 1922
- Tanytarsus magnituberculus Guha & Chaudhuri, 1985
- Tanytarsus magnus Trivinho-Strixino & Strixino, 2004
- Tanytarsus mancospinosus Ekrem, Reiss & Langton, 1999
- Tanytarsus manleyensis Glover, 1973
- Tanytarsus marauia Sanseverino, Wiedenbrug & Fittkau, 2003
- Tanytarsus marianae Reis, Lin & Ferreira-Keppler, 2022
- Tanytarsus martini Ekrem, Sublette & Sublette, 2003
- Tanytarsus mcmillani Freeman, 1958
- Tanytarsus medius Reiss, 1971
- Tanytarsus mendax Kieffer, 1925
- Tanytarsus mendumae Glover, 1973
- Tanytarsus messersmthi Ekrem, Sublette & Sublette, 2003
- Tanytarsus meta Dantas, Amat, Hamada & Giłka, 2022
- Tanytarsus micksmithi Cranston, 2000
- Tanytarsus miikegotoi Sasa, 1989
- Tanytarsus minimus (Kieffer, 1924)
- Tanytarsus minor Kieffer, 1915
- Tanytarsus minusculus Kieffer, 1922
- Tanytarsus minutipalpus Ekrem & Harrison, 1999
- Tanytarsus miriforceps (Kieffer, 1921)
- Tanytarsus miyakobrevis Sasa & Hasegawa, 1988
- Tanytarsus mongolneous Sasa & Suzuki, 1997
- Tanytarsus mongolopeus Sasa & Suzuki, 1997
- Tanytarsus monospinosus Ekrem & Reiss, 1999
- Tanytarsus monstrosus Chaudhuri, Ali & Majumdar, 1992
- Tanytarsus moruyaensis Glover, 1973
- Tanytarsus motosuensis Kawai, 1991
- Tanytarsus mulleri (Säwedal, 1981)
- Tanytarsus multipunctatus Brundin, 1947
- Tanytarsus muticus Johannsen, 1905
- Tanytarsus myrmedon Kieffer, 1922
- Tanytarsus nearcticus Butler, 2000
- Tanytarsus nemorosus Edwards, 1929
- Tanytarsus neoflavellus Malloch, 1915
- Tanytarsus neosydneyensis Glover, 1973
- Tanytarsus neotamaoctavus Ree, Jeong & Nam, 2011
- Tanytarsus nichollsi Glover, 1973
- Tanytarsus nietzkei Goetghebuer, 1935
- Tanytarsus niger Andersen, 1937
- Tanytarsus nigricollis Goetghebuer, 1939
- Tanytarsus nigricornis Goetghebuer, 1935
- Tanytarsus nigrocinctus Freeman, 1957
- Tanytarsus nilicola Kieffer, 1925
- Tanytarsus nilobius Kieffer, 1923
- Tanytarsus nimar Cranston, 1989
- Tanytarsus nocticola Kieffer, 1911
- Tanytarsus norvegiae Goetghebuer & Lenz, 1938
- Tanytarsus norvegicus (Kieffer, 1924)
- Tanytarsus norwegicus Goetghebuer, 1935
- Tanytarsus nympha (Kieffer, 1922)
- Tanytarsus obiriciae Trivinho-Strixino & Sonoda, 2006
- Tanytarsus occultus Brundin, 1949
- Tanytarsus ocularis (Kieffer, 1922)
- Tanytarsus ogasaquartus Sasa & Suzuki, 1997
- Tanytarsus ogasatertius Sasa & Suzuki, 1997
- Tanytarsus okuboi Sasa & Kikuchi, 1986
- Tanytarsus oligotrichus Rempel, 1939
- Tanytarsus olivaceus Goetghebuer, 1928
- Tanytarsus ortoni (Säwedal, 1981)
- Tanytarsus oscillans Johannsen, 1932
- Tanytarsus ovatus Johannsen, 1932
- Tanytarsus oyabelevis Sasa, Kawai & Ueno, 1988
- Tanytarsus oyaberotundus Sasa, Kawai & Ueno, 1988
- Tanytarsus oyamai Sasa, 1979
- Tanytarsus palettaris Verneaux, 1969
- Tanytarsus pallidicornis (Walker, 1856)
- Tanytarsus pallidissimus Kieffer, 1911
- Tanytarsus pallidulus Freeman, 1954
- Tanytarsus palmatus Freeman, 1961
- Tanytarsus pandus Sublette & Sasa, 1994
- Tanytarsus paraligulatus Reiss, 1972
- Tanytarsus parcepilosus Kieffer, 1918
- Tanytarsus parenti Goetghebuer, 1931
- Tanytarsus partenkirchensis Goetghebuer, 1934
- Tanytarsus paskevillensis Glover, 1973
- Tanytarsus patagonica (Reiss, 1972)
- Tanytarsus pathudsoni Ekrem, Sublette & Sublette, 2003
- Tanytarsus pectus Guha & Chaudhuri, 1984
- Tanytarsus pelagicus Tokunaga, 1933
- Tanytarsus pelsuei Spies, 1998
- Tanytarsus pentamerus (Kieffer, 1922)
- Tanytarsus pentaplastus Thienemann & Kieffer, 1916
- Tanytarsus phargmitis Kieffer, 1925
- Tanytarsus phobos Dantas, Giłka & Andersen, 2024
- Tanytarsus pictus (Doleschall, 1857)
- Tanytarsus pinedoi Dantas, Hamada & Giłka, 2023
- Tanytarsus piratus Chaudhuri & Mazumdar, 1998
- Tanytarsus pistra (Sublette & Sasa, 1994)
- Tanytarsus pollexus Chaudhuri & Datta, 1992
- Tanytarsus pollicis Reis, Lin & Ferreira-Keppler, 2022
- Tanytarsus ponapensis Tokunaga, 1964
- Tanytarsus poppigi (Säwedal, 1981)
- Tanytarsus poqomchi Vinogradova, Riss & Spies, 2009
- Tanytarsus productus (Zetterstedt, 1838)
- Tanytarsus psedudocurvicristatus Trivinho-Strixino, Wiedenbrug & Silva, 2015
- Tanytarsus pseudocongus Ekrem, 1999
- Tanytarsus pseudoheusdensis Lin, Stur & Ekrem, 2018
- Tanytarsus pseudolestagei Shilova, 1976
- Tanytarsus pseudotenellulus Goetghebuer, 1922
- Tanytarsus quadratus Sublette, 1964
- Tanytarsus quadridentatus Brundin, 1947
- Tanytarsus quadrivalva (Kieffer, 1922)
- Tanytarsus quinarius (Kieffer, 1922)
- Tanytarsus quinspinosus Chaudhuri & Datta, 1992
- Tanytarsus radens Krüger, 1944
- Tanytarsus rafaeli Reis, Lin & Ferreira-Keppler, 2022
- Tanytarsus ramosis (Kieffer, 1925)
- Tanytarsus recens Sublette, 1964
- Tanytarsus rectistylus Chaudhuri & Datta, 1992
- Tanytarsus recurvatus Brundin, 1947
- Tanytarsus reei Na & Bae, 2010
- Tanytarsus reissi Paggi, 1992
- Tanytarsus revolta Sanseverino, Wiedenbrug & Fittkau, 2003
- Tanytarsus rhabdomantis (Trivinho-Strixino & Strixino, 1991)
- Tanytarsus richardsi Glover, 1973
- Tanytarsus riedi Cranston, 2000
- Tanytarsus rieki Glover, 1973
- Tanytarsus rinihuensis Reiss, 1972
- Tanytarsus riopreto Fittkau & Reiss, 1973
- Tanytarsus ronaki Namayandeh & Ghaderi, 2021
- Tanytarsus rosario Cranston, 2000
- Tanytarsus rossaroi (Moubayed-Breil, 2017)
- Tanytarsus saetheri Ekrem, 1999
- Tanytarsus saetosus Lehmann, 1981
- Tanytarsus salinarius Kieffer, 1911
- Tanytarsus salmelai Giłka & Paasivirta, 2009
- Tanytarsus sandoensis Kieffer, 1915
- Tanytarsus schineri Goetghebuer, 1931
- Tanytarsus semibarbitarsus Glover, 1973
- Tanytarsus senarius Kieffer, 1922
- Tanytarsus seohyoni Ree & Jeong, 2010
- Tanytarsus seosanensis Ree & Kim, 2003
- Tanytarsus separabilis Brundin, 1947
- Tanytarsus sepp Ekrem, Sublette & Sublette, 2003
- Tanytarsus serra Dantas, Hamada & Giłka, 2023
- Tanytarsus setiger Kieffer, 1921
- Tanytarsus shouautumnalis Sasa, 1989
- Tanytarsus shoucygneus Sasa, 1989
- Tanytarsus shoudigitatus Sasa, 1989
- Tanytarsus siberiae Goetghebuer, 1933
- Tanytarsus signatifrons Kieffer, 1922
- Tanytarsus signatus Wulp, 1858
- Tanytarsus simantopequeus Sasa, Suzuki & Sakai, 1998
- Tanytarsus simantoquereus Sasa, Suzuki & Sakai, 1998
- Tanytarsus simantoreseus Sasa, Suzuki & Sakai, 1998
- Tanytarsus simantoseteus Sasa, Suzuki & Sakai, 1998
- Tanytarsus simantoteuus Sasa, Suzuki & Sakai, 1998
- Tanytarsus simantouveus Sasa, Suzuki & Sakai, 1998
- Tanytarsus simantoveweus Sasa, Suzuki & Sakai, 1998
- Tanytarsus simantowexeus Sasa, Suzuki & Sakai, 1998
- Tanytarsus simantoxeyeus Sasa, Suzuki & Sakai, 1998
- Tanytarsus simantoyezeus Sasa, Suzuki & Sakai, 1998
- Tanytarsus simplex Tokunaga, 1964
- Tanytarsus sinuatus Goetghebuer, 1936
- Tanytarsus smolandicus Brundin, 1947
- Tanytarsus songi Lin, Stur & Ekrem, 2018
- Tanytarsus sorachiabeus Sasa & Suzuki, 2001
- Tanytarsus spadiceonotatus Freeman, 1958
- Tanytarsus spiesi Ekrem, 1999
- Tanytarsus spinosus Freeman, 1961
- Tanytarsus spinulosus Kieffer, 1926
- Tanytarsus spixi (Säwedal, 1981)
- Tanytarsus striatulus Lindeberg, 1976
- Tanytarsus subejuncidus Goetghebuer, 1933
- Tanytarsus subinextentus Glover, 1973
- Tanytarsus subreflexens Freeman, 1955
- Tanytarsus sudagaijekeus Sasa & Tanaka, 2001
- Tanytarsus sudagaikeleus Sasa & Tanaka, 2001
- Tanytarsus superpenicillatus Ekrem, 1999
- Tanytarsus sylvaticus (Wulp, 1858)
- Tanytarsus synyunosecundus Ree, Jeong & Nam, 2011
- Tanytarsus takahashii Kawai & Sasa, 1985
- Tanytarsus tamadecimus Sasa, 1980
- Tanytarsus tamaduodecimus Sasa, 1983
- Tanytarsus tamagotoi Sasa, 1983
- Tanytarsus tamakutibasi Sasa, 1983
- Tanytarsus tamaoctavus Sasa, 1980
- Tanytarsus tamaundecimus Sasa, 1980
- Tanytarsus telmaticus Lindeberg, 1959
- Tanytarsus thaicus Moubayed-Breil, 1991
- Tanytarsus thienemanni Kieffer, 1925
- Tanytarsus thomasi Lin, Stur & Ekrem, 2018
- Tanytarsus tibialis Webb, 1969
- Tanytarsus tika (Tourenq, 1976)
- Tanytarsus tobaoctadecimus Kikuchi & Sasa, 1990
- Tanytarsus togacircus Sasa & Okazawa, 1991
- Tanytarsus toganiveus Sasa & Okazawa, 1991
- Tanytarsus tonebeceus Sasa & Tanaka, 2000
- Tanytarsus tonewefeus Sasa & Tanaka, 2002
- Tanytarsus tonewfegeus Sasa & Tanaka, 2002
- Tanytarsus tonewgeheus Sasa & Tanaka, 2002
- Tanytarsus tongmuensis Lin, Stur & Ekrem, 2018
- Tanytarsus tossai Ekrem, 1999
- Tanytarsus toyamafegeus Sasa, 1996
- Tanytarsus toyamageheus Sasa, 1996
- Tanytarsus toyamaheius Sasa, 1996
- Tanytarsus triangularis Goetghebuer, 1928
- Tanytarsus trifidus Freeman, 1958
- Tanytarsus trilobus Webb, 1969
- Tanytarsus tropicalis Kieffer, 1913
- Tanytarsus trux Giłka & Paasivirta, 2007
- Tanytarsus tuberculata Reiss, 1972
- Tanytarsus tumultuarius Ekrem & Reiss, 1999
- Tanytarsus tupungatensis Brèthes, 1909
- Tanytarsus tusimatbeceus Sasa & Suzuki, 1999
- Tanytarsus tusimatcedeus Sasa & Suzuki, 1999
- Tanytarsus tusimatdeeus Sasa & Suzuki, 1999
- Tanytarsus tusimatefeus Sasa & Suzuki, 1999
- Tanytarsus tusimatfegeus Sasa & Suzuki, 1999
- Tanytarsus tusimatgeheus Sasa & Suzuki, 1999
- Tanytarsus tusimatpequeus Sasa & Suzuki, 1999
- Tanytarsus unagiseptimus Sasa, 1985
- Tanytarsus unagisextus Sasa, 1985
- Tanytarsus ungulituberculata Singh & Kulshrestha, 1976
- Tanytarsus unifilis Kieffer, 1916
- Tanytarsus uraiensis Tokunaga, 1938
- Tanytarsus uresiacutus Sasa, 1989
- Tanytarsus usambarae Stur & Ekrem, 2000
- Tanytarsus usmaensis Pagast, 1931
- Tanytarsus uvus Chaudhuri & Mazumdar, 1998
- Tanytarsus varelus (Roback, 1957)
- Tanytarsus variegatus Birula, 1935
- Tanytarsus verralli Goetghebuer, 1928
- Tanytarsus verruculosus Goetghebuer, 1922
- Tanytarsus vespertinus Hutton, 1902
- Tanytarsus virens Kieffer, 1909
- Tanytarsus virgo Kieffer, 1917
- Tanytarsus viridellus Kieffer, 1922
- Tanytarsus viridicauda (Kieffer, 1922)
- Tanytarsus viridiforceps Kieffer, 1922
- Tanytarsus volgensis Miseiko, 1967
- Tanytarsus waika Sanseverino, Wiedenbrug & Fittkau, 2003
- Tanytarsus wangi Lin, Stur & Ekrem, 2018
- Tanytarsus wendylee Cranston, 2000
- Tanytarsus wirthi Ekrem, Sublette & Sublette, 2003
- Tanytarsus xinglongensis Lin, 2023
- Tanytarsus xingu Sanseverino, Wiedenbrug & Fittkau, 2003
- Tanytarsus yakuheius Sasa & Suzuki, 2000
- Tanytarsus yakuijeus Sasa & Suzuki, 2000
- Tanytarsus yakujekeus Sasa & Suzuki, 2000
- Tanytarsus yoni Ree & Jeong, 2010
- Tanytarsus zariae Freeman, 1958
- Tanytarsus zimbabwensis Harrison, 2004
- † Tanytarsus fereci Giłka, 2011
- † Tanytarsus forfex Giłka & Zakrzewska, 2020
- † Tanytarsus glaesarius Giłka & Zakrzewska, 2015
- † Tanytarsus insularis Meunier, 1904
- † Tanytarsus maritimus Meunier, 1904
- † Tanytarsus protogregarius Giłka & Zakrzewska, 2015
- † Tanytarsus ramus Giłka & Zakrzewska, 2020
- † Tanytarsus serafini Giłka, 2010
- † Tanytarsus szadziewskii (Giłka & Zakrzewska, 2013)
- † Tanytarsus wulpii Meunier, 1904
