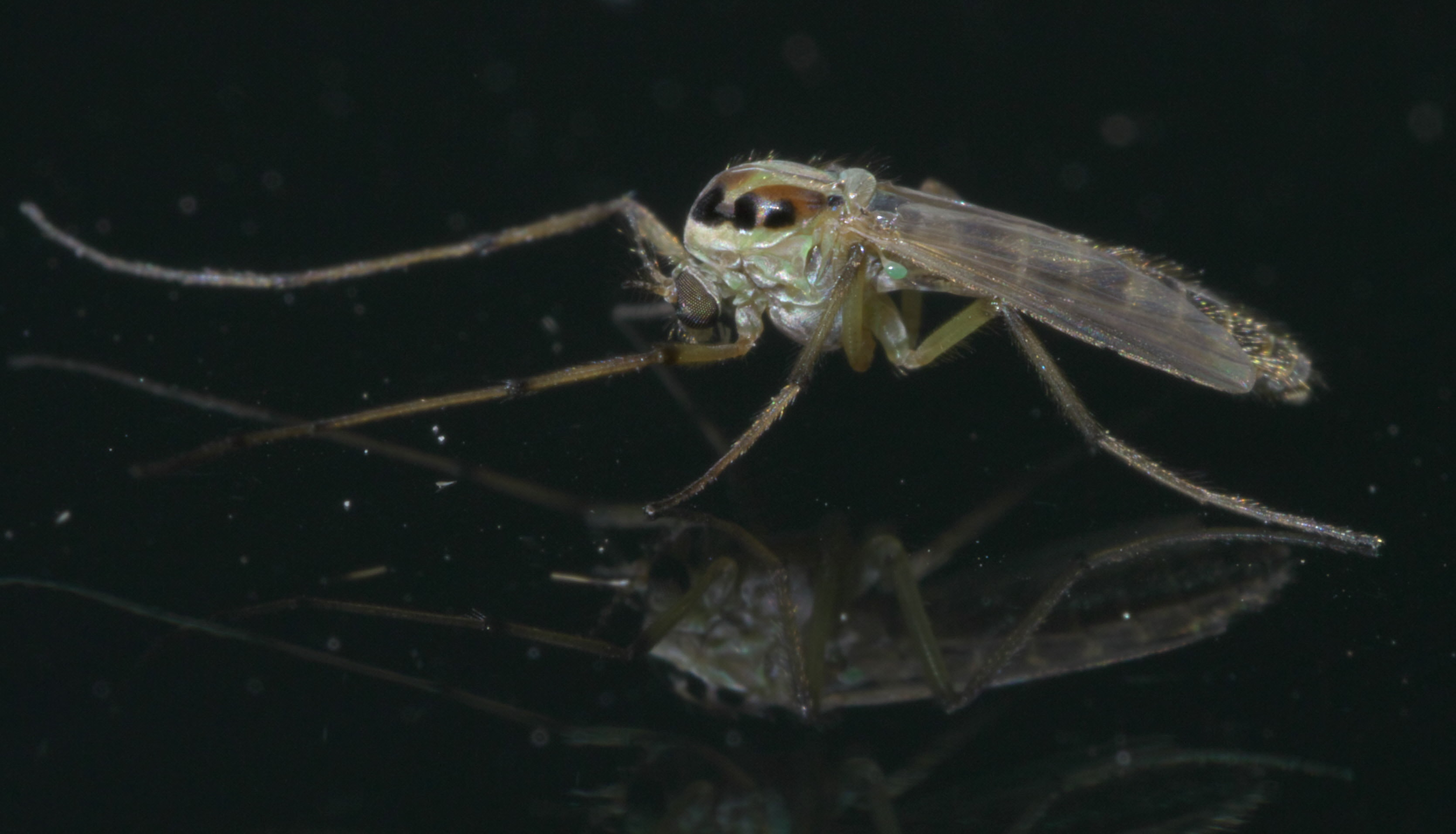
- Goeldichironomus carus

Scientific classification
- Domain: Eukaryota
- Kingdom: Animalia
- Phylum: Arthropoda
- Class: Insecta
- Order: Diptera
- Family: Chironomidae
- Subfamily: Chironominae
- Tribe: Chironomini
- Genus: Goeldichironomus; Fittkau, 1965

= Goeldichironomus =

Genus of flies

Goeldichironomus is a genus of midges in the family Chironomidae. There are about 14 described species in Goeldichironomus. Most species are found in tropical America, with G. carus ranging north to the southern United States.

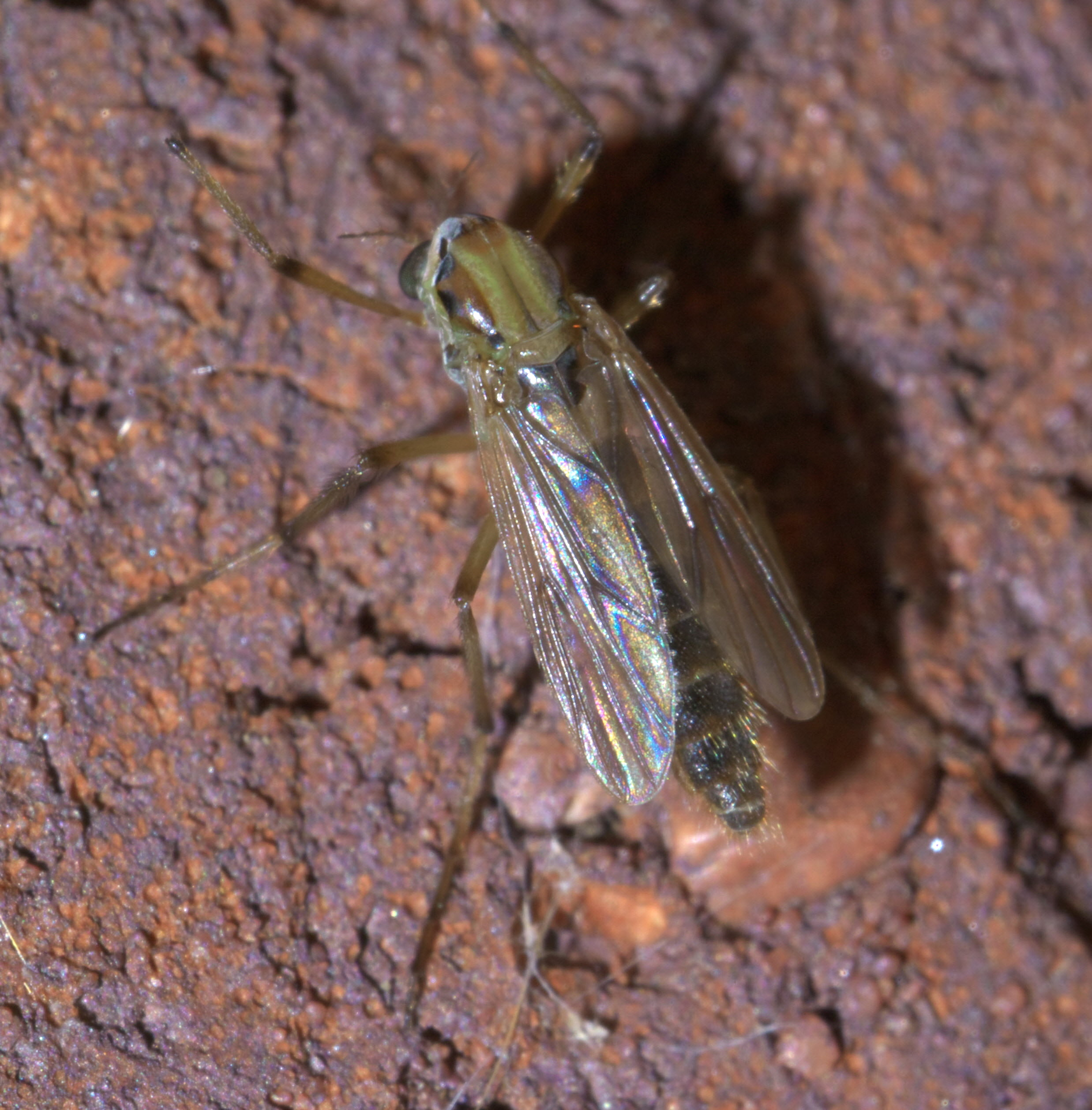
Goeldichironomus carus

== Species ==
These 14 species belong to the genus Goeldichironomus:

- Goeldichironomus adhaerens
- Goeldichironomus amazonicus (Fittkau, 1965)
- Goeldichironomus carus (Townes, 1945)
- Goeldichironomus devineyae (Beck, 1961)
- Goeldichironomus fluctuans Reiss, 1974
- Goeldichironomus holoprasinus (Goeldi, 1905)
- Goeldichironomus luridus Trivinho-Strixino & Strixino, 2005
- Goeldichironomus maculatus Strixino & Strixino, 1991
- Goeldichironomus natans Reiss, 1974
- Goeldichironomus neopictus Trivinho-Strixino & Strixino, 1998
- Goeldichironomus petiolicola Trivinho-Strixino & Strixino, 2005
- Goeldichironomus pictus Reiss, 1974
- Goeldichironomus serratus Reiss, 1974
- Goeldichironomus xiborena Reiss, 1974
