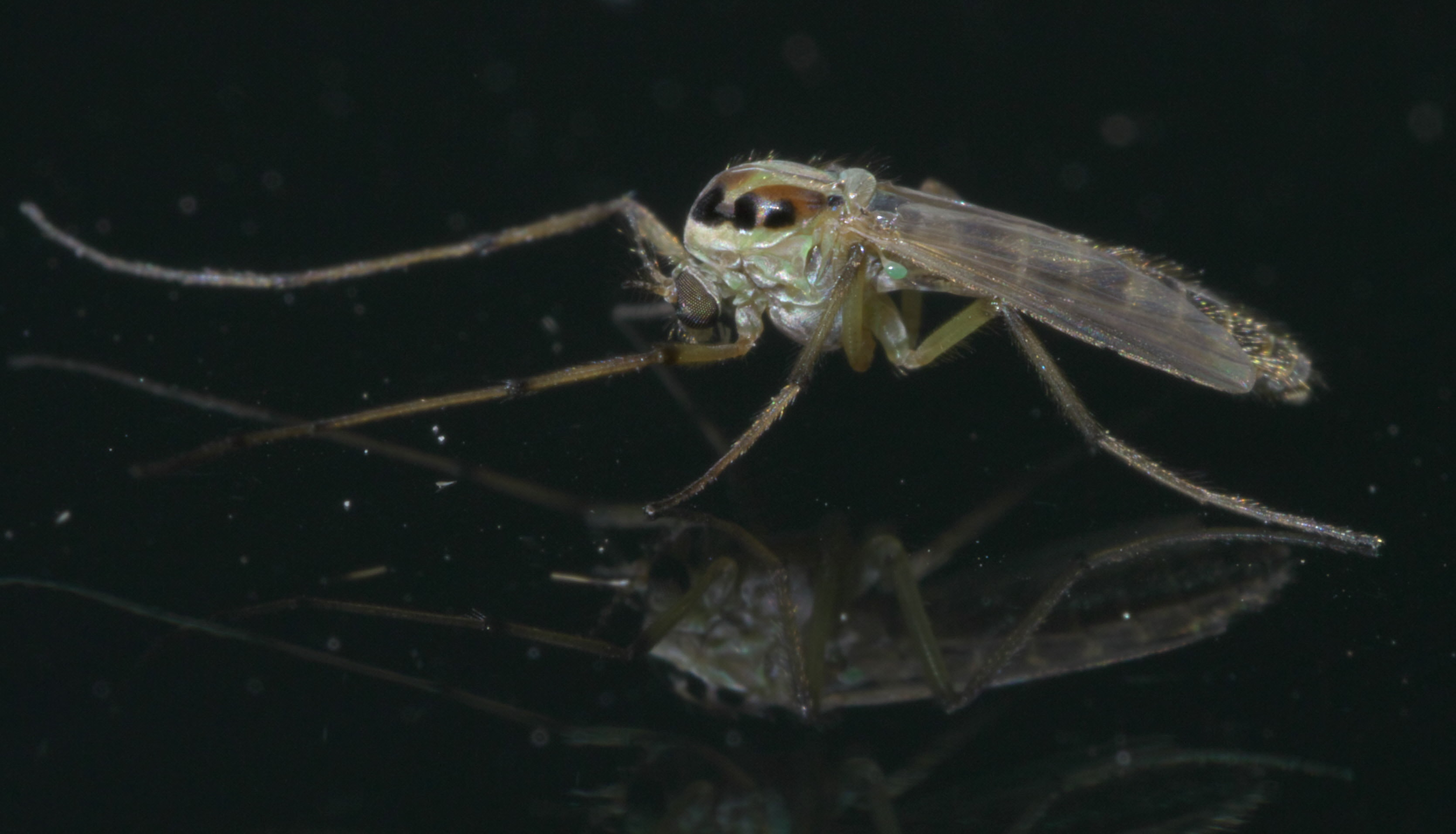

Scientific classification
- Domain: Eukaryota
- Kingdom: Animalia
- Phylum: Arthropoda
- Class: Insecta
- Order: Diptera
- Family: Chironomidae
- Tribe: Chironomini
- Genus: Goeldichironomus
- Species: G. carus

Binomial name
- Goeldichironomus carus (Townes, 1945)

Synonyms
- Tendipes carus Townes, 1945

= Goeldichironomus carus =

Species of fly

Goeldichironomus carus is a species of midge in the family Chironomidae.

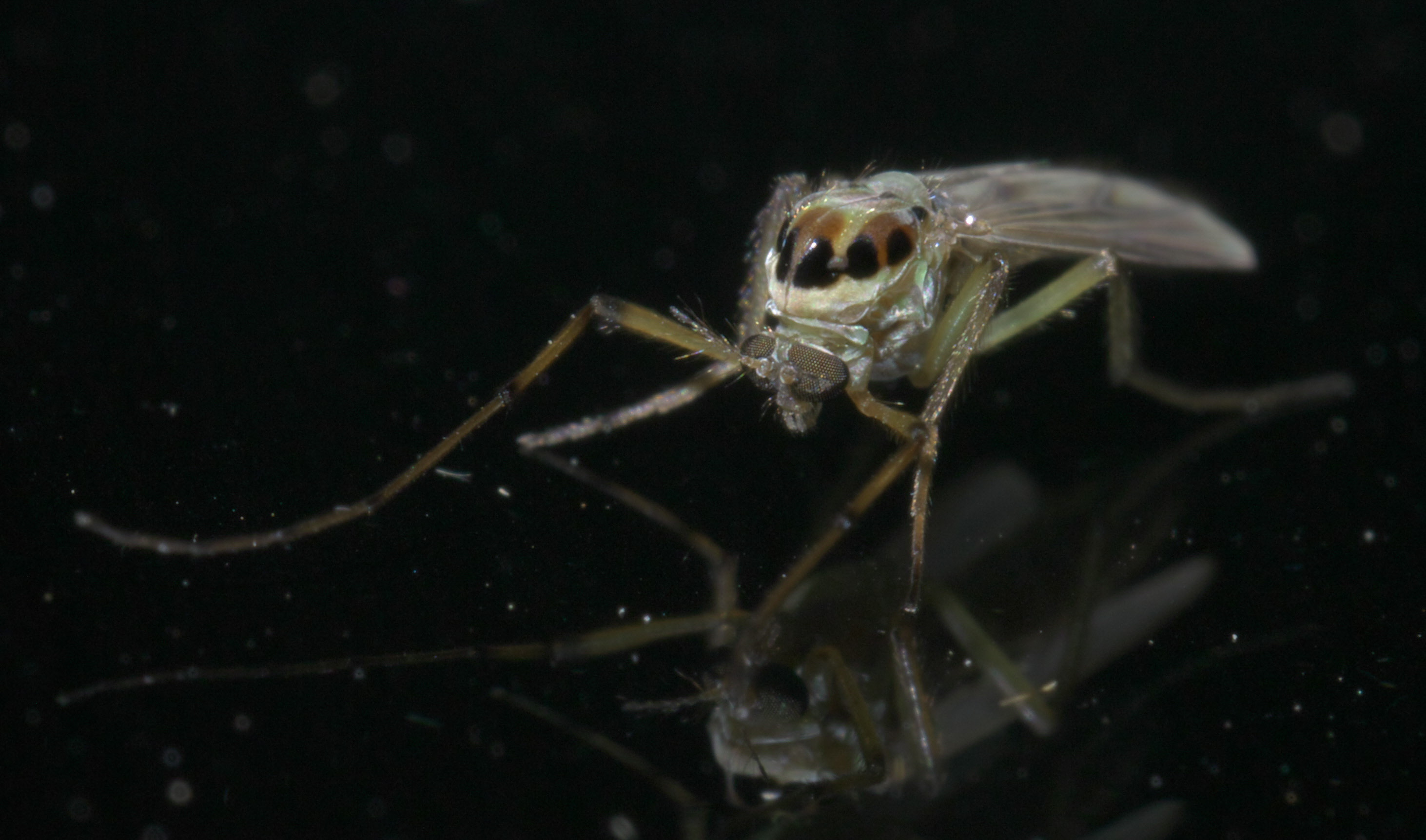

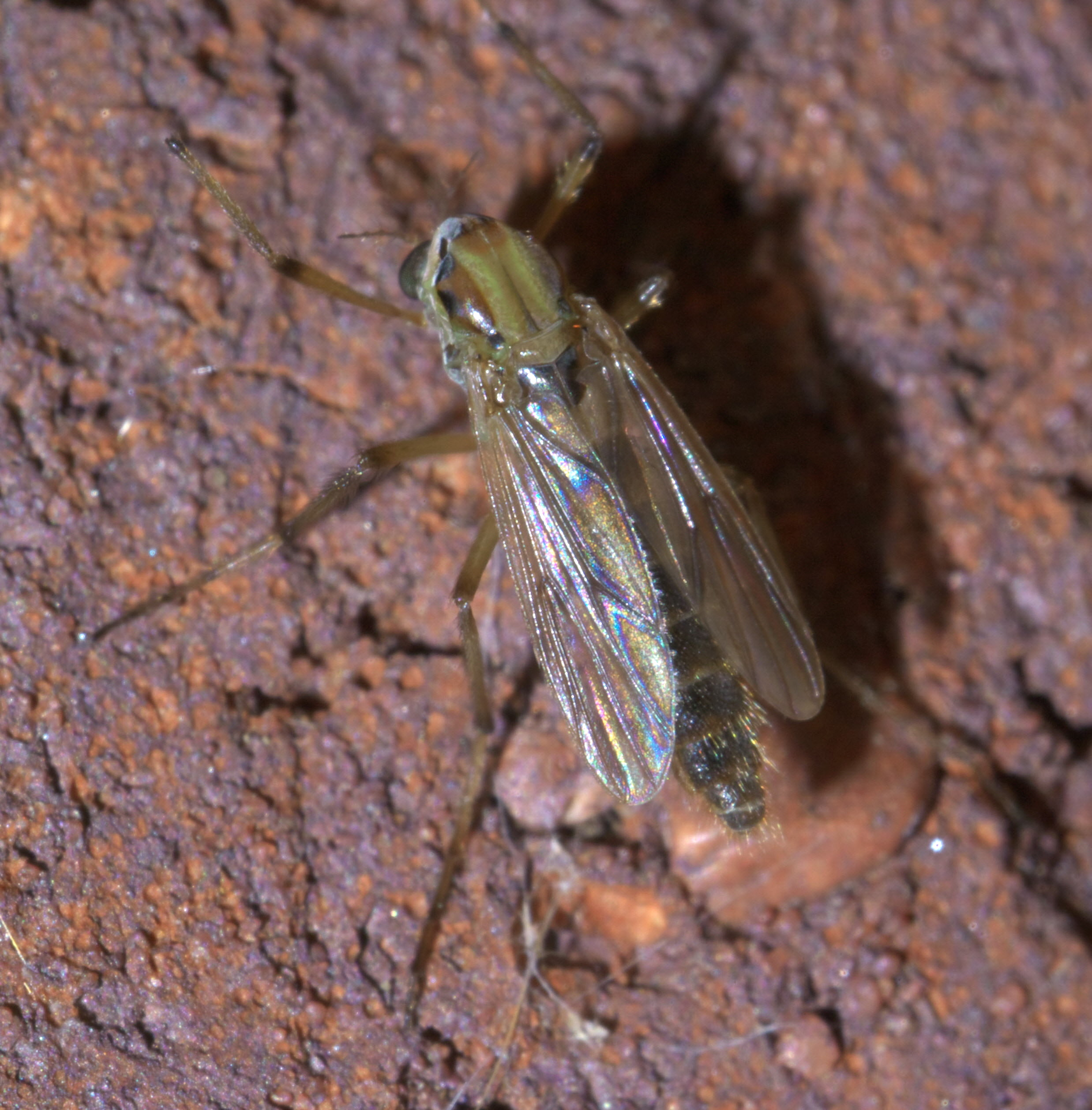
