= Stictochironomus han =

Scientific classification
- Domain: Eukaryota
- Kingdom: Animalia
- Phylum: Arthropoda
- Class: Insecta
- Order: Diptera
- Family: Chironomidae
- Genus: Stictochironomus
- Species: S. han

Binomial name
- Stictochironomus han Na & Bae, 2010

Species of fly

Stictochironomus han is a species of fly belonging to the family Chironomidae (non-biting midges). This is a relatively large, dark brown species, distinguished from related species by the wing being distinctively marked with several dark patches and by details of the genitalia. The specific name refers to the Han River, in Korea, where the species was discovered.
