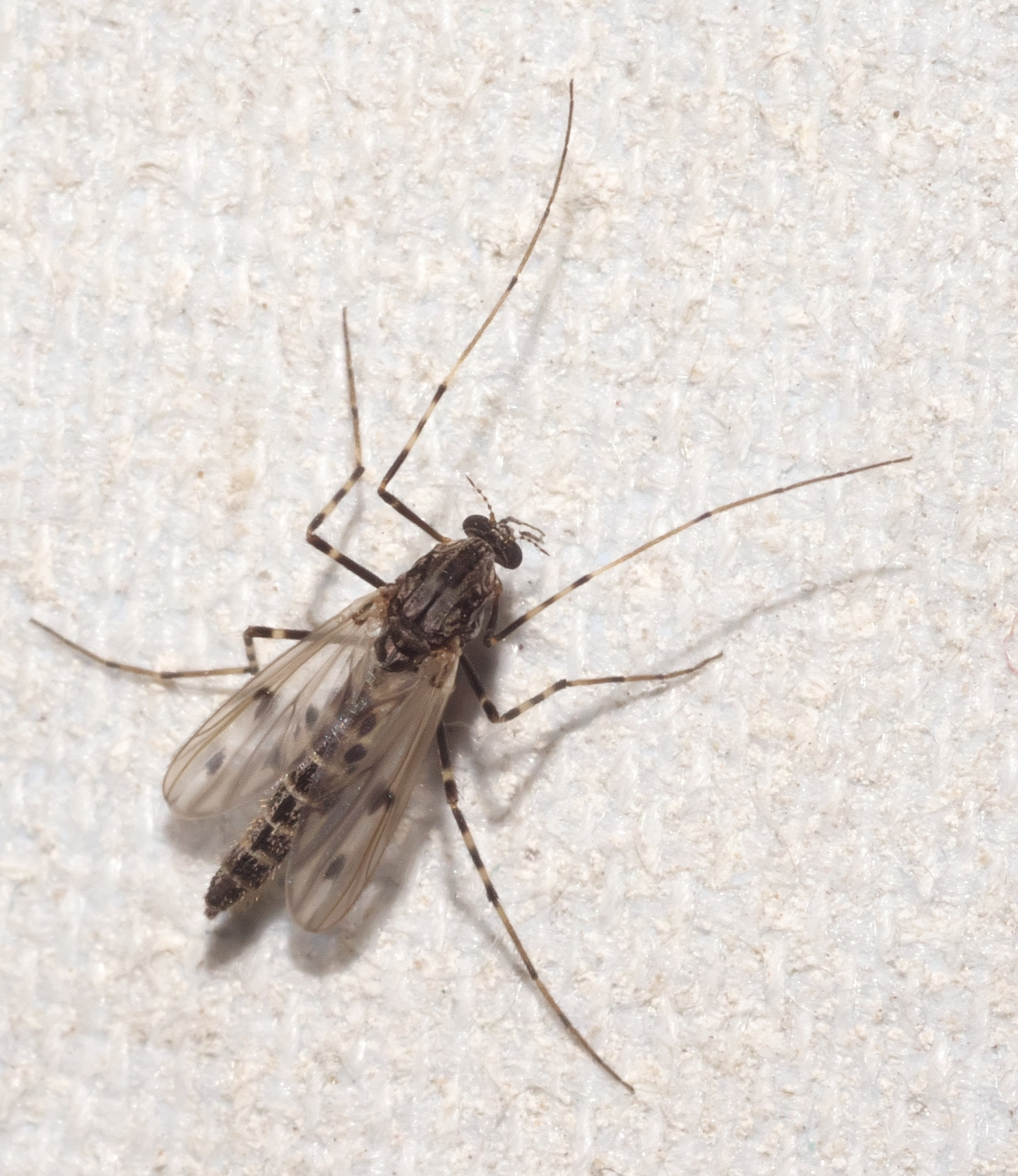
- Stictochironomus naevus, Arizona

Scientific classification
- Kingdom: Animalia
- Phylum: Arthropoda
- Clade: Pancrustacea
- Class: Insecta
- Order: Diptera
- Family: Chironomidae
- Subfamily: Chironominae
- Tribe: Chironomini
- Genus: Stictochironomus; Kieffer, 1919

Synonyms
- Allochironomus Kieffer, 1921; Kribiocallis Kieffer, 1921

= Stictochironomus =

Genus of non-biting midges

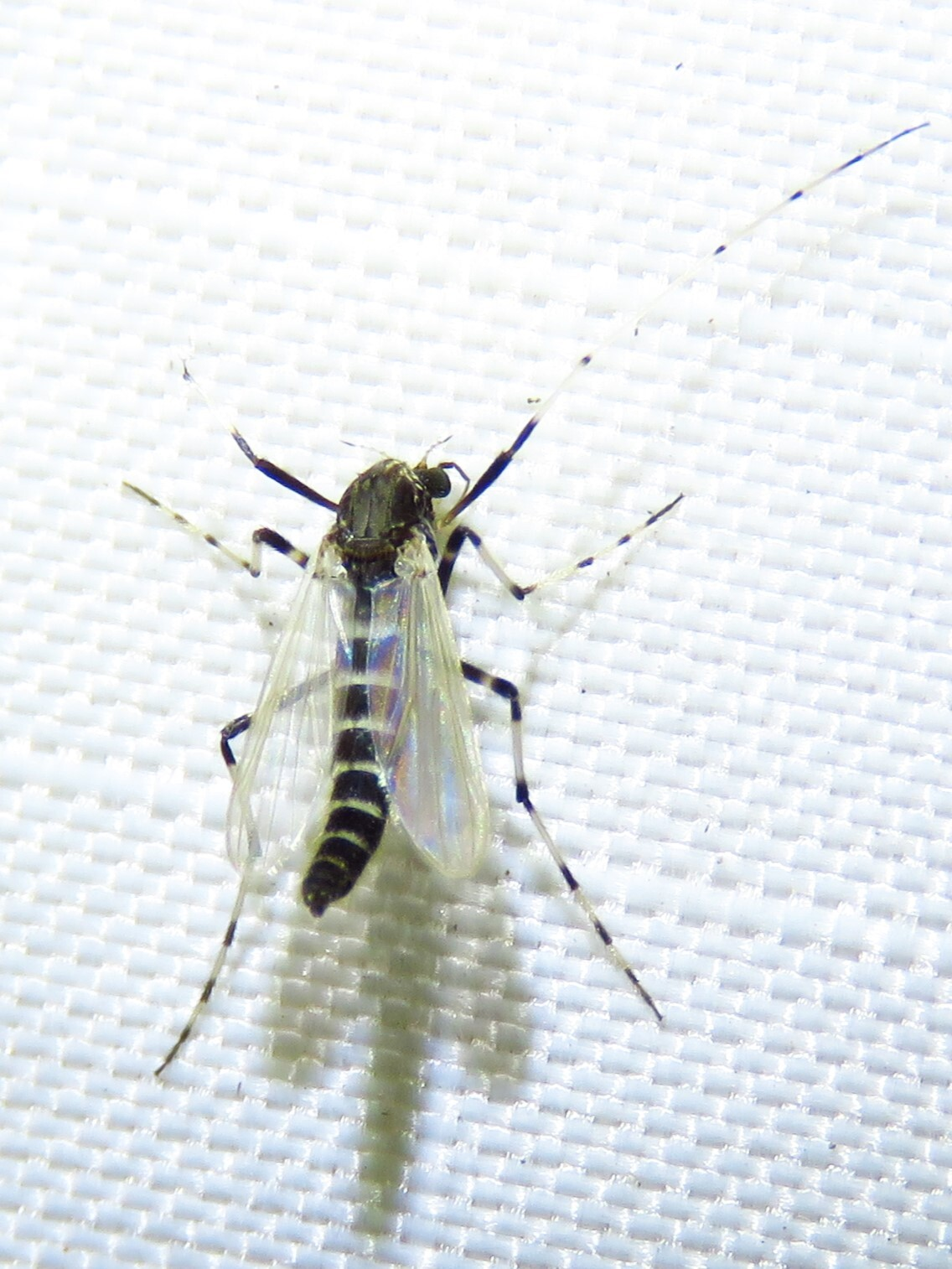
Stictochironomus devinctus, Texas

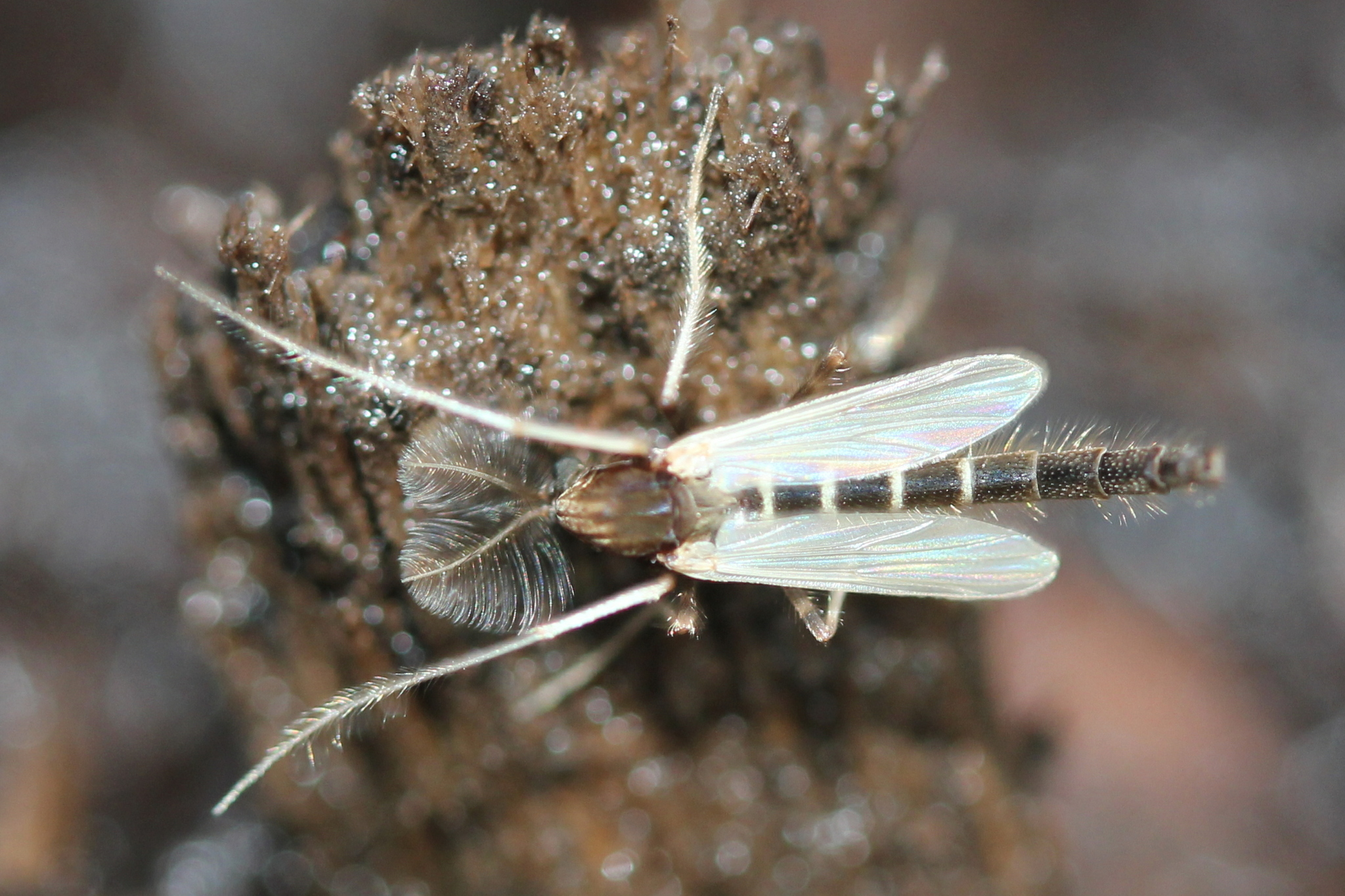
Stictochironomus albicrus, Illinois

Stictochironomus is a genus of non-biting midges in the family Chironomidae. There are more than 50 described species in Stictochironomus.

Members of this genus often have strongly marked wings and legs. The larvae of these midges may also have distinct dark patterns on the dorsal side of the head capsule. They live in sand and other sediments in a variety of fresh water habitats in densities of several hundred per square meter.

Stictochironomus maculipennis larvae have been reported to live relatively deep, up to 6 cm, in the sediment to avoid predation. It has been suggested they migrate between the deeper sediment layers and the sediment surface to breathe.

== Species ==
These 59 species belong to the genus Stictochironomus:

- Stictochironomus abasirisecundus Sasa & Shirasaka, 1988
- Stictochironomus aduncum (Konar & Hazra, 2017)
- Stictochironomus akizukii (Tokunaga, 1940)
- Stictochironomus albicrus (Townes, 1945)
- Stictochironomus annulicrus (Townes, 1945)
- Stictochironomus assimilis (Zetterstedt, 1838)
- Stictochironomus bengalensis Konar, 2021
- Stictochironomus bisignatus (Kieffer, 1918)
- Stictochironomus caffrarius (Kieffer, 1921)
- Stictochironomus clavipennae (Hazra, Sanyal & Brahma, 2016)
- Stictochironomus crassiforceps (Kieffer, 1922)
- Stictochironomus devinctus (Say, 1829)
- Stictochironomus exterflexus (Hazra, Sanyal & Brahma, 2016)
- Stictochironomus festivus Kieffer, 1921
- Stictochironomus flagellatum (Chaudhuri, Guha & Gupta, 1981)
- Stictochironomus flavicingulus (Walker, 1848)
- Stictochironomus fluviaticus (Skuse, 1889)
- Stictochironomus fusiformis (Kieffer, 1921)
- Stictochironomus han Na & Bae, 2010
- Stictochironomus hibaradecimus (Sasa & Suzuki, 1998)
- Stictochironomus illawarra Freeman, 1961
- Stictochironomus juncaii Qi, Shi & Wang, 2008
- Stictochironomus kamiprimus Sasa & Hirabayashi, 1991
- Stictochironomus kisopallidulus Sasa & Kondo, 1994
- Stictochironomus kondoi Hashimoto, 1987
- Stictochironomus labeculatus Goetghebuer, 1938
- Stictochironomus longipugionis (Sahin, 1987)
- Stictochironomus longtanensis Lei & Zhang, 2026
- Stictochironomus lutosus (Townes, 1945)
- Stictochironomus maculipennis (Meigen, 1818)
- Stictochironomus marmoreus (Townes, 1945)
- Stictochironomus multannulatus Tokunaga, 1938
- Stictochironomus naevus (Mitchell, 1908)
- Stictochironomus narzykulovi Akhrorov, 1968
- Stictochironomus natalensis Freeman, 1958
- Stictochironomus oppetitus (Walker, 1856)
- Stictochironomus palliatus (Coquillett, 1902)
- Stictochironomus pictulus (Meigen, 1830)
- Stictochironomus psammophilus Chernovsky, 1949
- Stictochironomus psilopterus (Edwards, 1935)
- Stictochironomus pulchipennis Kawai & Imbayashi, 2008
- Stictochironomus puripennis (Kieffer, 1921)
- Stictochironomus quadrimaculatus Song & Qi, 2024
- Stictochironomus quagga (Townes, 1945)
- Stictochironomus reissi Cranston, 1989
- Stictochironomus rosenscholdi (Zetterstedt, 1838)
- Stictochironomus simantomaculatum (Sasa, Suzuki & Sakai, 1998)
- Stictochironomus sinsauensis Ree & Jeong, 2010
- Stictochironomus stackelbergi (Goetghebuer, 1938)
- Stictochironomus sticticus (Fabricius, 1782)
- Stictochironomus tadizkistanicus Akhrorov, 1968
- Stictochironomus tamamontuki Sasa, 1983
- Stictochironomus townesi Tokunaga, 1964
- Stictochironomus translucens (Johannsen, 1932)
- Stictochironomus trifuscipes Song & Qi, 2024
- Stictochironomus unguiculatus (Malloch, 1934)
- Stictochironomus varius (Townes, 1945)
- Stictochironomus virgatus (Townes, 1945)
- Stictochironomus yalvacii Sahin, 1987
