= Paratendipes nitidulus =

Scientific classification
- Kingdom: Animalia
- Phylum: Arthropoda
- Clade: Pancrustacea
- Class: Insecta
- Order: Diptera
- Family: Chironomidae
- Subfamily: Chironominae
- Tribe: Chironomini
- Genus: Paratendipes
- Species: P. nitidulus

Binomial name
- Paratendipes nitidulus (Coquillett, 1901)

Synonyms
- Chironomus nitidellus (Coquillett, 1901); Chironomus nitidulus Coquillett, 1901

Species of non-biting midges

Paratendipes nitidulus is a species of midge in the family Chironomidae, found in eastern North America.
