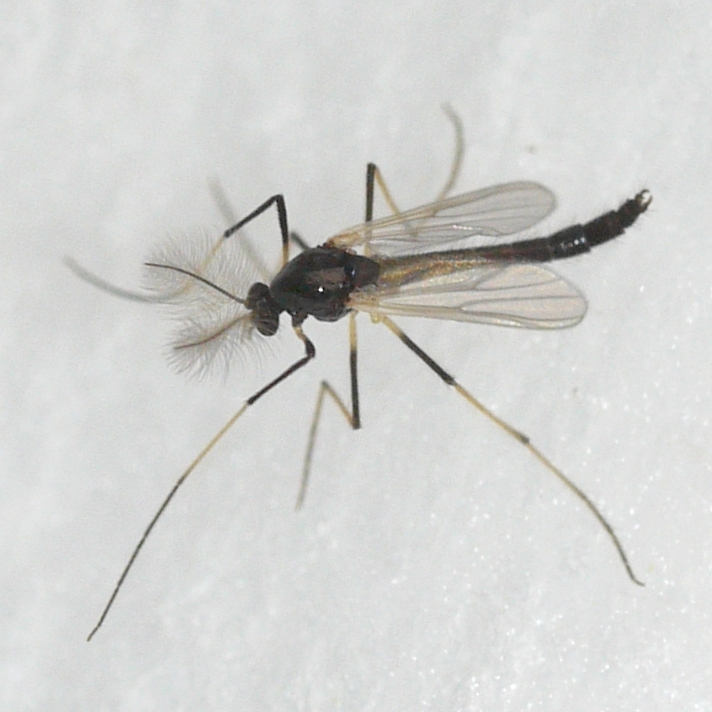
- Paratendipes albimanus, Wisconsin

Scientific classification
- Kingdom: Animalia
- Phylum: Arthropoda
- Clade: Pancrustacea
- Class: Insecta
- Order: Diptera
- Family: Chironomidae
- Subfamily: Chironominae
- Tribe: Chironomini
- Genus: Paratendipes; Kieffer, 1911

Synonyms
- Kribiodoxa Kieffer, 1921; Synparatendipes Thienemann & Bause, 1913

= Paratendipes =

Genus of non-biting midges

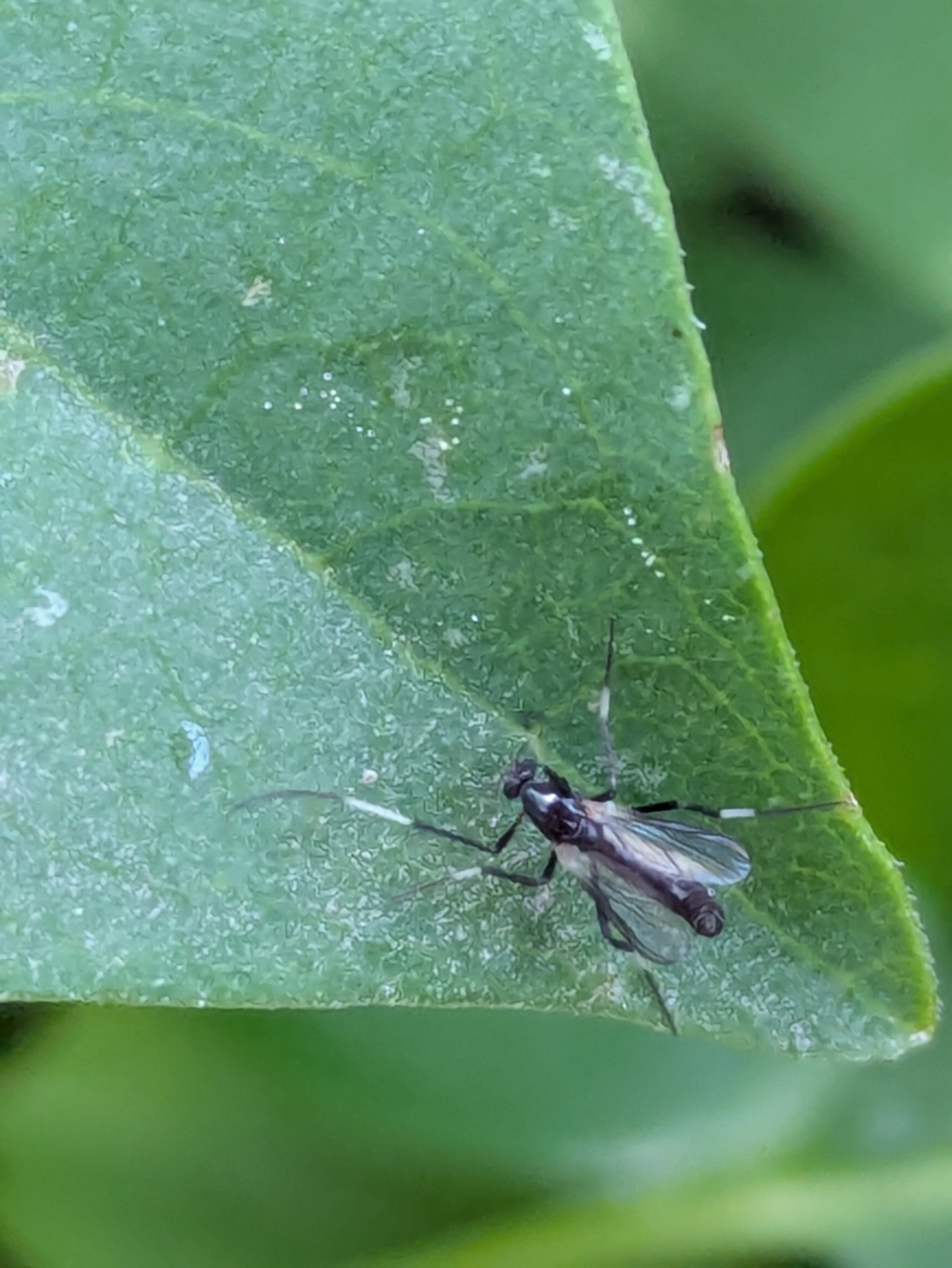
Paratendipes fuscitibia, Colorado

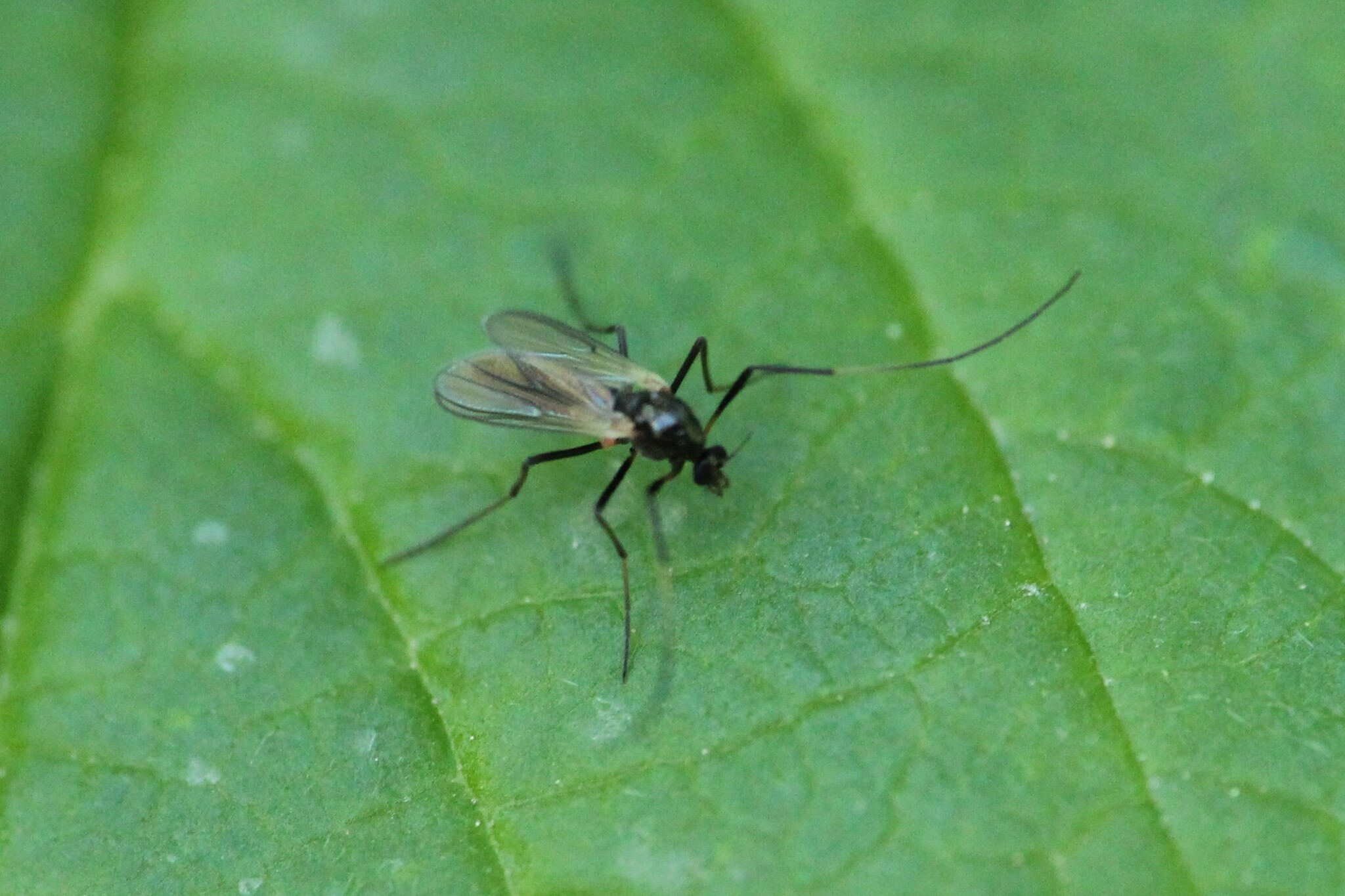
Paratendipes plebeius, Sweden

Paratendipes is a genus of non-biting midges in the family Chironomidae. There are more than 40 described species in Paratendipes, found worldwide.

== Species ==
These 44 species belong to the genus Paratendipes:

- Paratendipes albimanus (Meigen, 1818)
- Paratendipes albitibia Kieffer, 1922
- Paratendipes angustus Lin, Qi & Wang, 2011
- Paratendipes basidens Townes, 1945
- Paratendipes basilaristorus Qi, Shi & Wang, 2009
- Paratendipes bifascipennis (Tokunaga, 1940)
- Paratendipes connectens Lipina, 1926
- Paratendipes crosskeyi Freeman, 1956
- Paratendipes demirsoyus Sahin, 1987
- Paratendipes digraphis (Kieffer, 1911)
- Paratendipes dolens (Kieffer, 1910)
- Paratendipes duplicatus (Johannsen, 1937)
- Paratendipes fuscitibia Sublette, 1960
- Paratendipes guizhouensis Qi, Shi & Wang, 2009
- Paratendipes hexatomus Kieffer, 1921
- Paratendipes hirsutus Guha & Chaudhuri, 1985
- Paratendipes inarmatus Freeman, 1962
- Paratendipes intermedius Chernovsky, 1949
- Paratendipes irioheius (Sasa & Suzuki, 2000)
- Paratendipes lahaulensis (Singh, 1958)
- Paratendipes laticollus Zorina, 2004
- Paratendipes maculipennis Dutta & Chaudhuri, 1996
- Paratendipes melanothorax (Kieffer, 1911)
- Paratendipes nigrimanus Kieffer, 1921
- Paratendipes nitidulus (Coquillett, 1901)
- Paratendipes nubilipennis Freeman, 1957
- Paratendipes nubilus (Meigen, 1830)
- Paratendipes nudisquama (Edwards, 1929)
- Paratendipes pelargus Kieffer, 1913
- Paratendipes penicilliceps Dutta & Chaudhuri, 1996
- Paratendipes plebeius (Meigen, 1818)
- Paratendipes reidi Freeman, 1957
- Paratendipes sinelobus Albu, 1980
- Paratendipes sinespina Cranston, 2020
- Paratendipes spinipes Cranston, 2020
- Paratendipes stictoptera (Kieffer, 1922)
- Paratendipes striatus (Kieffer, 1925)
- Paratendipes subaequalis (Malloch, 1915)
- Paratendipes tamafuscus Kobayashi & Sasa, 1991
- Paratendipes thermophilus Townes, 1945
- Paratendipes tshernovskii Zorina, 2004
- Paratendipes tunisiae Kieffer, 1918
- Paratendipes unimaculipennis Chattopadhyay & Chaudhuri, 1993
- † Paratendipes separata Doitteau & Nel, 2007
