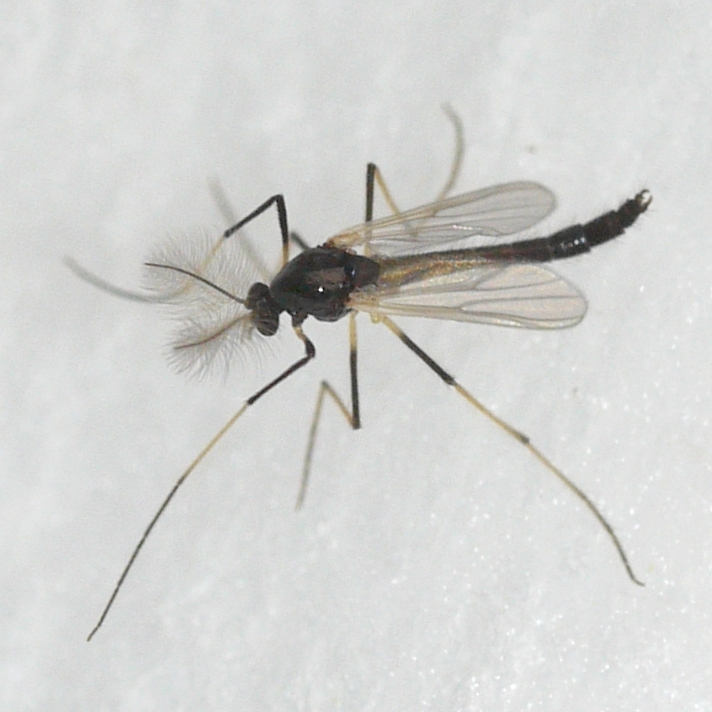
- Paratendipes albimanus

Scientific classification
- Kingdom: Animalia
- Phylum: Arthropoda
- Class: Insecta
- Order: Diptera
- Family: Chironomidae
- Tribe: Chironomini
- Genus: Paratendipes
- Species: P. albimanus

Binomial name
- Paratendipes albimanus (Meigen, 1919)

Synonyms
- Chironomus albimanus Meigen, 1818; Chironomus annularis Meigen, 1804

= Paratendipes albimanus =

Species of fly

Paratendipes albimanus is a species of midge in the family Chironomidae. It is found in Europe and North America.
