= Paratendipes fuscitibia =

Scientific classification
- Domain: Eukaryota
- Kingdom: Animalia
- Phylum: Arthropoda
- Class: Insecta
- Order: Diptera
- Family: Chironomidae
- Tribe: Chironomini
- Genus: Paratendipes
- Species: P. fuscitibia

Binomial name
- Paratendipes fuscitibia Sublette, 1960

Species of fly

Paratendipes fuscitibia is a species of midge in the family Chironomidae.
