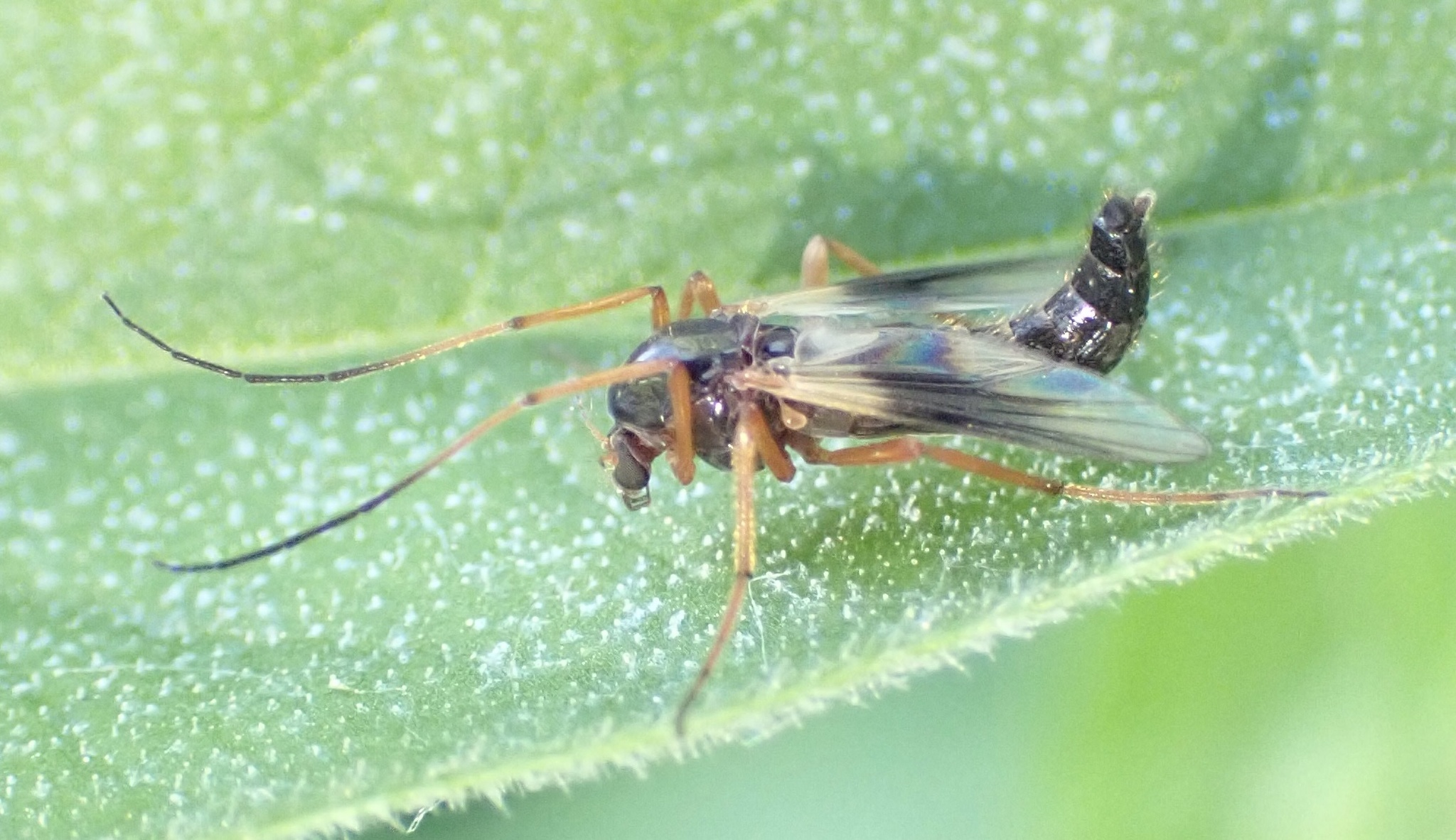
- Demeijerea rufipes, Netherlands

Scientific classification
- Kingdom: Animalia
- Phylum: Arthropoda
- Clade: Pancrustacea
- Class: Insecta
- Order: Diptera
- Family: Chironomidae
- Subfamily: Chironominae
- Tribe: Chironomini
- Genus: Demeijerea; Kruseman, 1933

Synonyms
- Demeigerea Kruseman, 1933; Prophytochironomus Lenz, 1957

= Demeijerea =

Genus of non-biting midges

Demeijerea is a genus of non-biting midges in the family Chironomidae. There are about six described species in Demeijerea, found mainly in North America and Europe.

== Species ==
These six species belong to the genus Demeijerea:

- Demeijerea abrupta (Townes, 1945)
- Demeijerea atrimana (Coquillett, 1902)
- Demeijerea brachialis (Coquillett, 1901)
- Demeijerea obreptus (Townes, 1945)
- Demeijerea rufipes (Linnaeus, 1761)
- Demeijerea spinulata Saether, 2011
