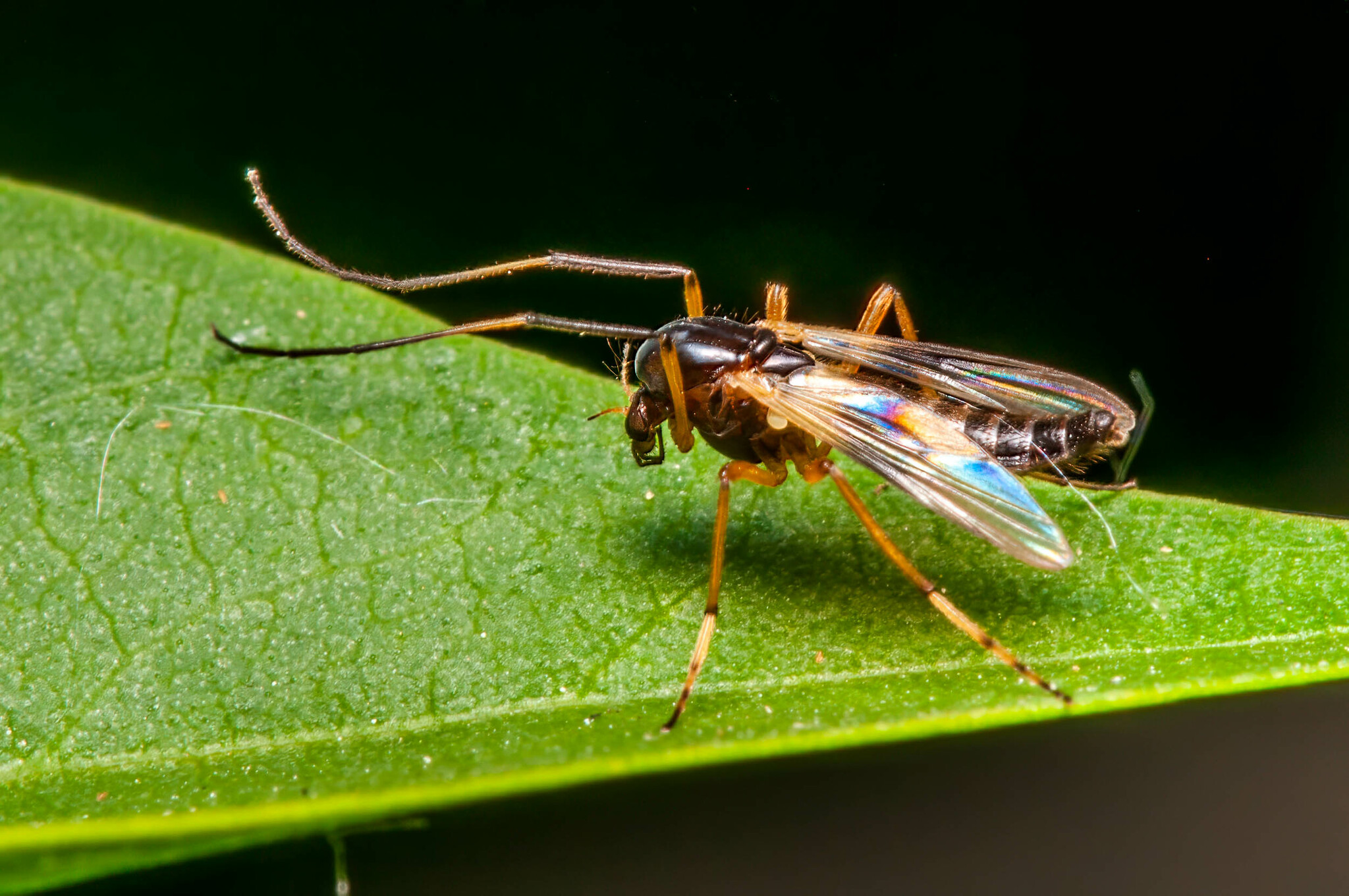
- Demeijerea brachialis, Canada

Scientific classification
- Kingdom: Animalia
- Phylum: Arthropoda
- Clade: Pancrustacea
- Class: Insecta
- Order: Diptera
- Family: Chironomidae
- Tribe: Chironomini
- Genus: Demeijerea
- Species: D. brachialis

Binomial name
- Demeijerea brachialis (Coquillett, 1907)

Synonyms
- Chironomus brachialis Coquillett, 1907

= Demeijerea brachialis =

Species of fly

Demeijerea brachialis is a species of midge in the family Chironomidae found in North America.
