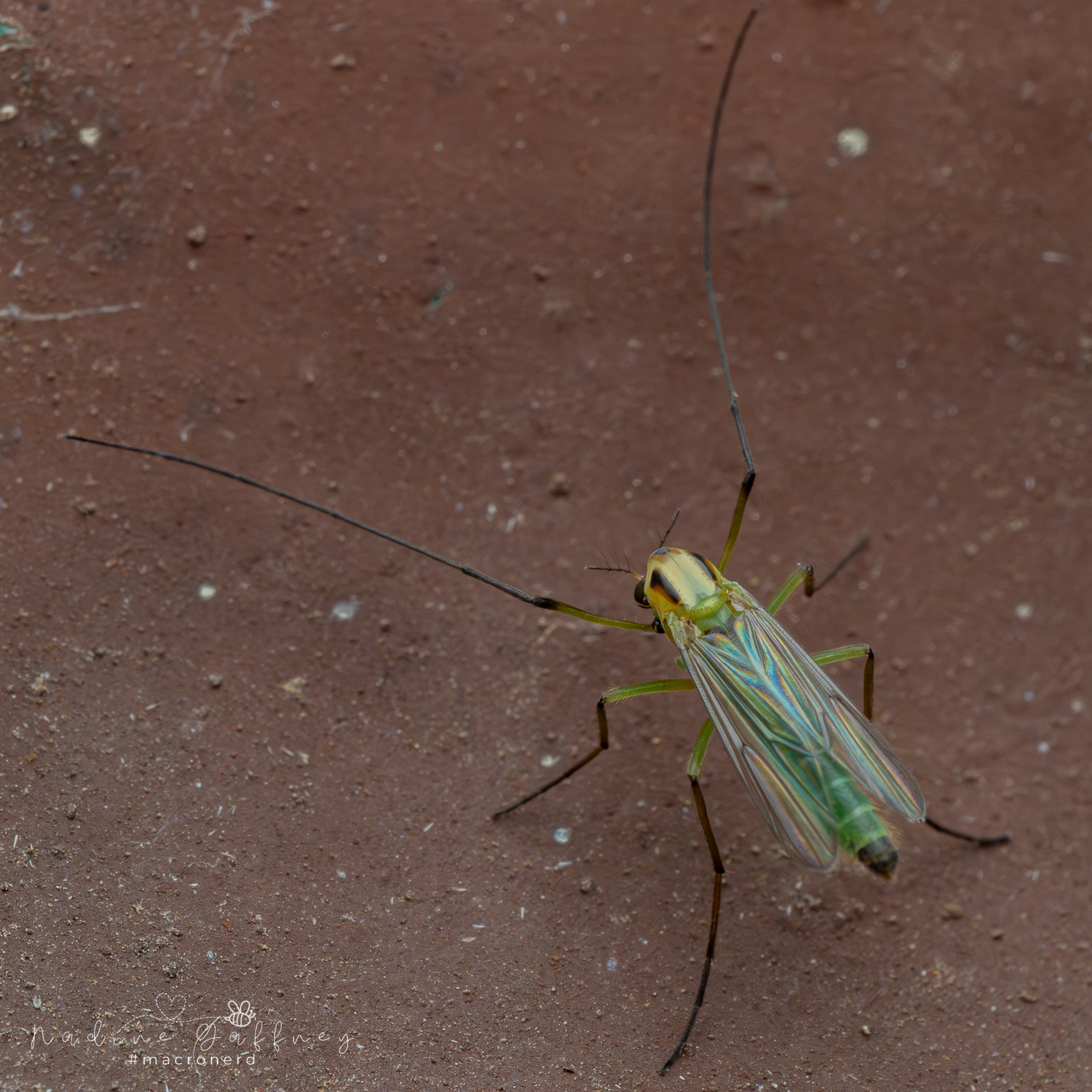
- In Australia

Scientific classification
- Kingdom: Animalia
- Phylum: Arthropoda
- Clade: Pancrustacea
- Class: Insecta
- Order: Diptera
- Family: Chironomidae
- Subfamily: Chironominae
- Tribe: Chironomini
- Genus: Kiefferulus; Goetghebuer, 1922

= Kiefferulus =

Genus of non-biting midges

Kiefferulus is a genus of non-biting midges in the family Chironomidae. There are more than 20 described species in the genus Kiefferulus.

== Species ==
These 22 species belong to the genus Kiefferulus:

- Kiefferulus atroxitarsis Sas & Mazumdar, 2012
- Kiefferulus brevipalpis (Kieffer, 1918)
- Kiefferulus chloronotus (Kieffer, 1911)
- Kiefferulus coclearis Sas & Mazumdar, 2012
- Kiefferulus dux (Johannsen, 1905)
- Kiefferulus hexhamensis (Skuse, 1889)
- Kiefferulus inciderus Chattopadhyay & Chaudhuri, 1991
- Kiefferulus interinctus (Skuse, 1889)
- Kiefferulus iriobeceus (Sasa & Suzuki, 2000)
- Kiefferulus lativalva (Kieffer, 1917)
- Kiefferulus martini (Freeman, 1961)
- Kiefferulus niloticus (Kieffer, 1923)
- Kiefferulus opalensis Forsyth, 1975
- Kiefferulus papillus Sas & Mazumdar, 2012
- Kiefferulus paratinctus (Martin, 1964)
- Kiefferulus pruinosus (Freeman, 1961)
- Kiefferulus pungens (Townes, 1945)
- Kiefferulus renicornis Sas & Mazumdar, 2012
- Kiefferulus tendipediformis (Goetghebuer, 1921)
- Kiefferulus trigonum Song, Wang, Bu & Qi, 2020
- Kiefferulus tumidus (Johannsen, 1932)
- Kiefferulus umbraticola (Yamamoto, 1979)
