= Kiefferulus dux =

Scientific classification
- Domain: Eukaryota
- Kingdom: Animalia
- Phylum: Arthropoda
- Class: Insecta
- Order: Diptera
- Family: Chironomidae
- Tribe: Chironomini
- Genus: Kiefferulus
- Species: K. dux

Binomial name
- Kiefferulus dux (Johannsen, 1905)

Synonyms
- Chironomus dux Johannsen, 1905

Species of fly

Kiefferulus dux is a species of midge in the family Chironomidae.
