= Crossover value =

Concept in genetics

In genetics, the crossover value is the linked frequency of chromosomal crossover between two gene loci (markers). For a fixed set of genetic and environmental conditions, recombination in a particular region of a linkage structure (chromosome) tends to be constant and the same is then true for the crossover value which is used in the production of genetic maps.

== Origin in cell biology ==
Crossover implies the exchange of chromosomal segments between non-sister chromatids, in meiosis during the production of gametes. The effect is to assort the alleles on parental chromosomes, so that the gametes carry recombinations of genes different from either parent. This has the overall effect of increasing the variety of phenotypes present in a population.

The process of non-sister chromatid exchanges, including the crossover value, can be observed directly in stained cells, and indirectly by the presence or absence of genetic markers on the chromosomes. The visible crossovers are called chiasmata.

The large-scale effect of crossover is to spread genetic variations within a population, as well as genetic basis for the selection of the most adaptable phenotypes. The crossover value depends on the mutual distance of the genetic loci observed. The crossover value is equal to the recombination value or fraction when the distance between the markers in question is short.

== See also ==
- Chromosomal crossover
- Genetic recombination
