= Mitotic DNA Synthesis =

Mitotic DNA Synthesis (MiDAS) is a unique form of DNA replication that occurs during the mitotic phase of the cell cycle. This phenomenon was first discovered is U2OS osteosarcoma cancer cell lines in 2015, and was later discovered in S. cerevisiae in 2020.

== DNA Stressors ==
Cells normally complete DNA replication in the S (synthesis) phase of the cell cycle, but when they experience replication stressors, typically caused by hard‑to‑replicate DNA sequences or a lack of necessary nucleotides, some regions cannot finish replicating on time. This is important in cancer cells, which rely on MiDAS to withstand their high levels of replication stress.

These cancer cells experience chronic replication stress and enter mitosis with under‑replicated DNA. They need the MiDAS to complete replication, avoid nondisjunction and chromosome segregation errors, and maintain the genome’s potential despite its incompleteness.

== Overview ==
For the process to initiate, certain regions on the replication need to be stressed and incorrectly copied, signaling that an alternate process needs to occur to fix the wrong base pairs. The cell will do its best to eliminate the stress, preventing it from completing replication, and will finish the synthesis as late as the early stages of Mitosis. Some stressors may not be able to be stopped, forcing the cell to utilize other proteins and enzymes to correct the mistakes.

Even with defenses to prevent incomplete DNA, the cell may still need to utilize MiDAS to complete DNA replication in its entirety. The cell will begin to unwind and open the unfinished DNA using enzyme nucleases such as SLX1-SLX4 and MUS81-EME1. Typically, these nucleases will work as the cell transitions from the G2 phase of the cell cycle into the mitotic phase of the cell cycle. Various other proteins like RECQ5 and TRAIP will aid in the transition, helping with more DNA splitting and unwinding and giving better access to the main nucleases to complete the job.

Once the DNA has been separated enough by the nucleases, it will proceed with the MiDAS processes to finish the DNA replication. New proteins join the repair process: RAD52, Pol δ and Pol ζ. RAD52 helps the cell’s DNA strands realign together, while Pol δ and Pol ζ aim to further construct the strands themselves correctly. Since these are meant to add nucleotides to the DNA strand, they are referred to as polymerases in the process. However, other proteins, namely POLD3 and REV1, arrive as well. POLD3 assists the polymerases overall, but REV1 targets the Pol ζ protein to help. To finally complete the MiDAS mechanism, the cell activates other proteins to rejoin the DNA strands, and allows the cell to have fully replicated DNA before it gets split in Mitosis.
