= Meiomitosis =

Aberrant cellular division pathway

In cell biology, meiomitosis is an aberrant cellular division pathway that combines normal mitosis pathways with ectopically expressed meiotic machinery resulting in genomic instability.

== Description ==
Meiotic pathways are normally restricted to germ cells. Meiotic proteins drive double stranded DNA breaks, chiasma formation, sister chromatid adhesion and rearrange the spindle apparatus.

During meiosis, there are 2 sets of cell divisions, the second division is similar to mitosis in that sister chromatids are directly separated. However, in the first meiotic division the sister chromatids are held together by cohesins and segregated from their homologous pair of cohesion bound sister chromatids after resolution of recombination crossover points (chiasma) between the homologous pairs. The collision of mitosis and meiosis (first division) pathways could cause abnormal chiasma formation, abnormal cohesion expression, and mitotic/meiotic spindle defects that could result in insertions, deletions, abnormal segregation, DNA bridging, and potentially failure of cell division altogether resulting in polyploidy.

== Role in cancer ==
Meiotic proteins have been noted to be expressed in cancer particularly melanoma and lymphoma. In cutaneous T-cell lymphoma meiosis proteins have been shown to be regulated with the cell cycle. Lymphoma cell lines have also been noted to up-regulate meiosis specific genes with irradiation and a correlation with mitotic arrest and polyploidy has been noted. The overall role of meiomitosis in cancer development and evolution has yet to be determined.

== Research ==
Meiomitosis in oogenesis from somatic cells has been demonstrated to generate semi-functional oocytes (egg cells) from human skin fibroblasts. This technique was able to convert diploid somatic cells (with 46 chromosomes) into haploid gametes (with 23 chromosomes) without lengthy induced pluripotent stem cell (iPSC) reprogramming. It combines somatic cell nuclear transfer (SCNT), with chemical and environmental cues to induce chromosome segregation. The researchers removed the nucleus from a donor oocyte and replaced it with the nucleus from a somatic cell, preserving the oocyte's cytoplasm. Next the somatic nucleus, is prompted to undergo meiomitosis, expelling one chromosome set into a polar body (meiotic phase), yielding a haploid oocyte. This is achieved using kinase inhibitors and maturation media, bypassing full meiotic recombination. In a 2025 proof-of-concept study by Oregon Health & Science University researchers, 82 functional oocytes were produced. Fertilized with donor sperm via in vitro fertilization (IVF), 7 (9%) reached the blastocyst stage, forming embryos with diploid genetics. The viable embryos showed balanced parental contributions. However, this initial work featured low efficiency, chromosome errors, and ethical concerns such as embryo viability and designer babies.

== Sources ==
- Grichnik, JM (2008). "Melanoma, Nevogenesis, and Stem Cell Biology". Journal of Investigative Dermatology. 128 (10): 2365–80. doi:10.1038/jid.2008.166. PMID 18787546.
- Scott, L; Byrnes, D; Eller, M; Rosa, A; Escandon, J; Grichnik, J (2013). "Potential Role of Meiosis Proteins in Melanoma Chromosomal Instability". Journal of Skin Cancer. 2013 190109. doi:10.1155/2013/190109. PMC 3694528. PMID 23840955.
