= Chromosomal crossover =

Cellular process

Crossing over occurs between prophase I and metaphase I and is the process where two homologous non-sister chromatids pair up with each other and exchange different segments of genetic material to form two recombinant chromosome sister chromatids. It can also happen during mitotic division, which may result in loss of heterozygosity. Crossing over is important for the normal segregation of chromosomes during meiosis. Crossing over also accounts for genetic variation, because due to the swapping of genetic material during crossing over, the chromatids held together by the centromere are no longer identical. So, when the chromosomes go on to meiosis II and separate, some of the daughter cells receive daughter chromosomes with recombined alleles. Due to this genetic recombination, the offspring have a different set of alleles and genes than their parents do. In the diagram, genes B and b are crossed over with each other, making the resulting recombinants after meiosis Ab, AB, ab, and aB.

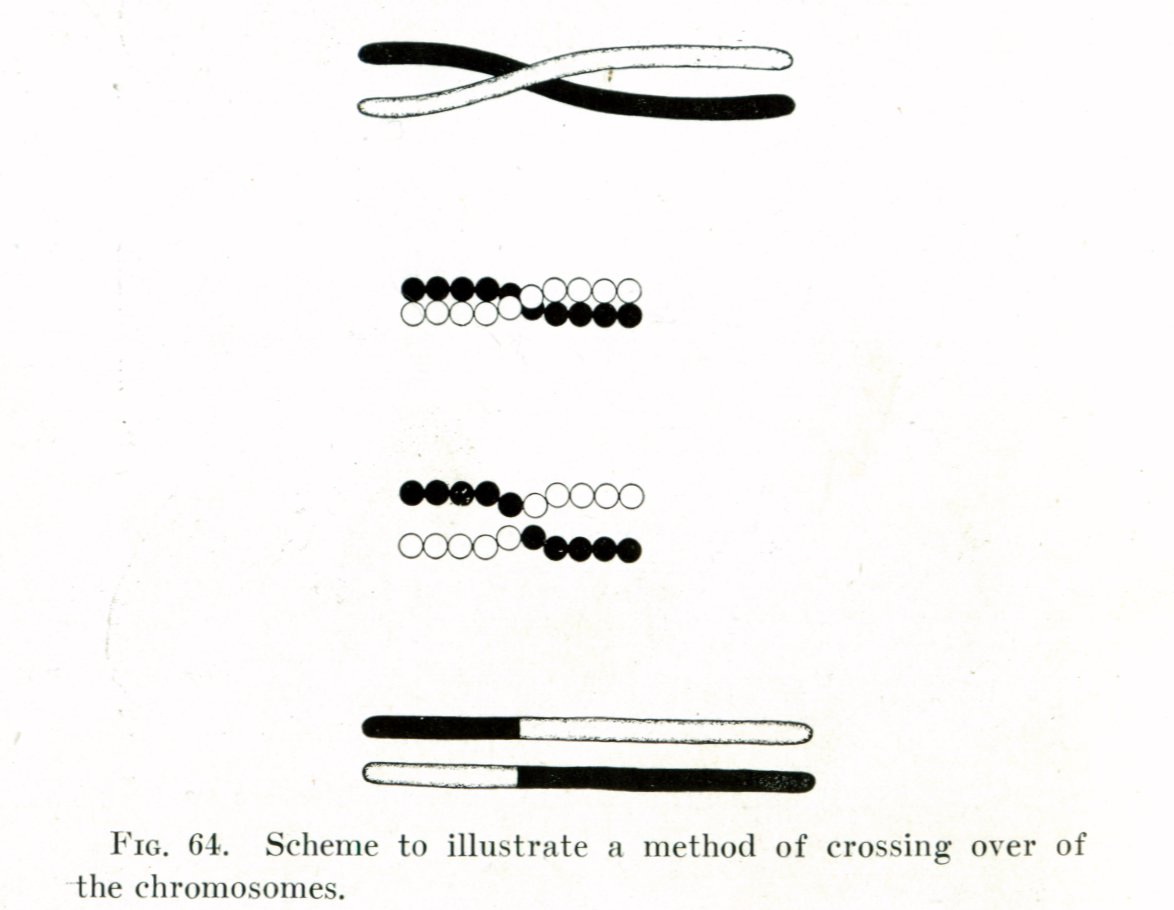
Thomas Hunt Morgan's illustration of crossing over (1916)

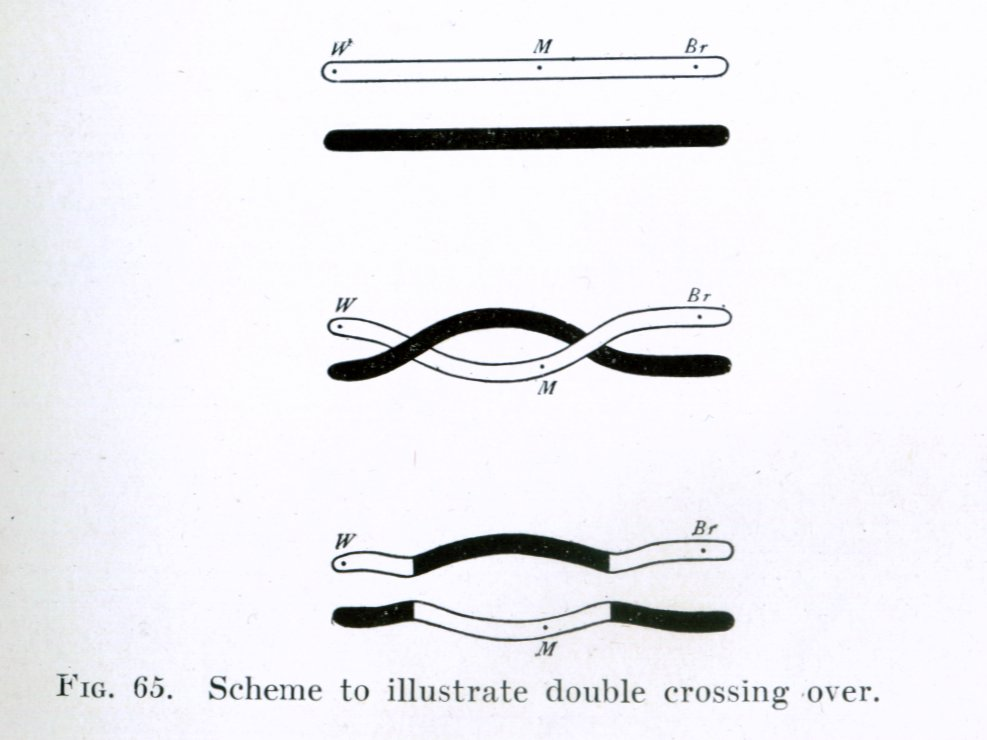
A double crossing over

Chromosomal crossover, or crossing over, is the exchange of genetic material during sexual reproduction between two homologous chromosomes' non-sister chromatids that results in recombinant chromosomes. It is one of the final phases of genetic recombination, which occurs in the pachytene stage of prophase I of meiosis during a process called synapsis. Synapsis is usually initiated before the synaptonemal complex develops and is not completed until near the end of prophase I. Crossover usually occurs when matching regions on matching chromosomes break and then reconnect to the other chromosome, resulting in chiasma which are the visible evidence of crossing over.

== History of discovery ==
Crossing over was described, in theory, by Thomas Hunt Morgan; the term crossover was coined by Morgan and Eleth Cattell. Hunt relied on the discovery of Frans Alfons Janssens who described the phenomenon in 1909 and had called it "chiasmatypie". The term chiasma is linked, if not identical, to chromosomal crossover. Morgan immediately saw the great importance of Janssens' cytological interpretation of chiasmata to the experimental results of his research on the heredity of Drosophila. The physical basis of crossing over was first demonstrated by Harriet Creighton and Barbara McClintock in 1931.

The linked frequency of crossing over between two gene loci (markers) is the crossing-over value. For fixed set of genetic and environmental conditions, recombination in a particular region of a linkage structure (chromosome) tends to be constant and the same is then true for the crossing-over value which is used in the production of genetic maps.

When Hotta et al. in 1977 compared meiotic crossing-over (recombination) in lily and mouse they concluded that diverse eukaryotes share a common pattern. This finding suggested that chromosomal crossing over is a general characteristic of eukaryotic meiosis.

== Origins ==
There are two popular and overlapping theories that explain the origins of crossing-over, coming from the different theories on the origin of meiosis. The first theory rests upon the idea that meiosis evolved as another method of DNA repair, and thus crossing-over is a novel way to replace possibly damaged sections of DNA. The second theory comes from the idea that meiosis evolved from bacterial transformation, with the function of propagating diversity.

In 1931, Barbara McClintock discovered a triploid maize plant. She made key findings regarding corn's karyotype, including the size and shape of the chromosomes. McClintock used the prophase and metaphase stages of mitosis to describe the morphology of corn's chromosomes, and later showed the first ever cytological demonstration of crossing over in meiosis. Working with student Harriet Creighton, McClintock also made significant contributions to the early understanding of codependency of linked genes.

=== DNA repair theory ===
Crossing over and DNA repair are very similar processes, which utilize many of the same protein complexes. In her report, "The Significance of Responses of the Genome to Challenge", McClintock studied corn to show how corn's genome would change itself to overcome threats to its survival. She used 450 self-pollinated plants that received from each parent a chromosome with a ruptured end. She used modified patterns of gene expression on different sectors of leaves of her corn plants to show that transposable elements ("controlling elements") hide in the genome, and their mobility allows them to alter the action of genes at different loci. These elements can also restructure the genome, anywhere from a few nucleotides to whole segments of chromosome. Recombinases and primases lay a foundation of nucleotides along the DNA sequence. One such particular protein complex that is conserved between processes is RAD51, a well conserved recombinase protein that has been shown to be crucial in DNA repair as well as cross over.

Several other genes in D. melanogaster have been linked as well to both processes, by showing that mutants at these specific loci cannot undergo DNA repair or crossing over. Such genes include mei-41, mei-9, hdm, spnA, and brca2. This large group of conserved genes between processes supports the theory of a close evolutionary relationship. Furthermore, DNA repair and crossover have been found to favor similar regions on chromosomes. In an experiment using radiation hybrid mapping on wheat's (Triticum aestivum L.) 3B chromosome, crossing over and DNA repair were found to occur predominantly in the same regions. Furthermore, crossing over has been correlated to occur in response to stressful, and likely DNA damaging, conditions.

=== Links to bacterial transformation ===
The process of bacterial transformation also shares many similarities with chromosomal cross over, particularly in the formation of overhangs on the sides of the broken DNA strand, allowing for the annealing of a new strand. Bacterial transformation itself has been linked to DNA repair many times. The second theory comes from the idea that meiosis evolved from bacterial transformation, with the function of propagating genetic diversity. Thus, this evidence suggests that it is a question of whether cross over is linked to DNA repair or bacterial transformation, as the two do not appear to be mutually exclusive. It is likely that crossing over may have evolved from bacterial transformation, which in turn developed from DNA repair, thus explaining the links between all three processes.

== Biochemistry of meiotic recombination ==
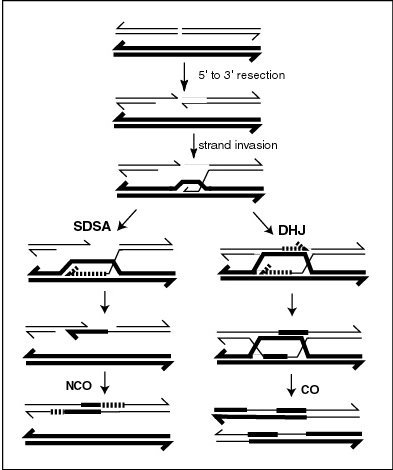
A current model of meiotic recombination, initiated by a double-strand break or gap, followed by pairing with a homologous chromosome and strand invasion to initiate the recombinational repair process. Repair of the gap can lead to crossover (CO) or non-crossover (NCO) of the flanking regions. CO recombination is thought to occur by the Double Holliday Junction (DHJ) model, illustrated on the right, above. NCO recombinants are thought to occur primarily by the Synthesis Dependent Strand Annealing (SDSA) model, illustrated on the left, above. Most recombination events appear to be the SDSA type.

Meiotic recombination may be initiated by double-stranded breaks that are introduced into the DNA by exposure to DNA damaging agents, or the Spo11 protein. One or more exonucleases then digest the 5' ends generated by the double-stranded breaks to produce 3' single-stranded DNA tails (see diagram). The meiosis-specific recombinase Dmc1 and the general recombinase Rad51 coat the single-stranded DNA to form nucleoprotein filaments. The recombinases catalyze invasion of the opposite chromatid by the single-stranded DNA from one end of the break. Next, the 3' end of the invading DNA primes DNA synthesis, causing displacement of the complementary strand, which subsequently anneals to the single-stranded DNA generated from the other end of the initial double-stranded break. The structure that results is a cross-strand exchange, also known as a Holliday junction. The contact between two chromatids that will soon undergo crossing-over is known as a chiasma. The Holliday junction is a tetrahedral structure which can be 'pulled' by other recombinases, moving it along the four-stranded structure.

Holliday Junction

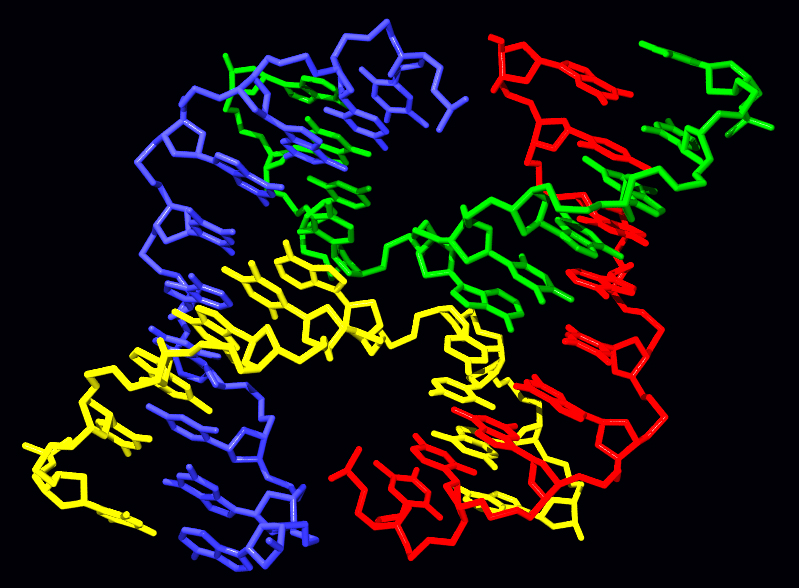
Molecular structure of a Holliday junction.

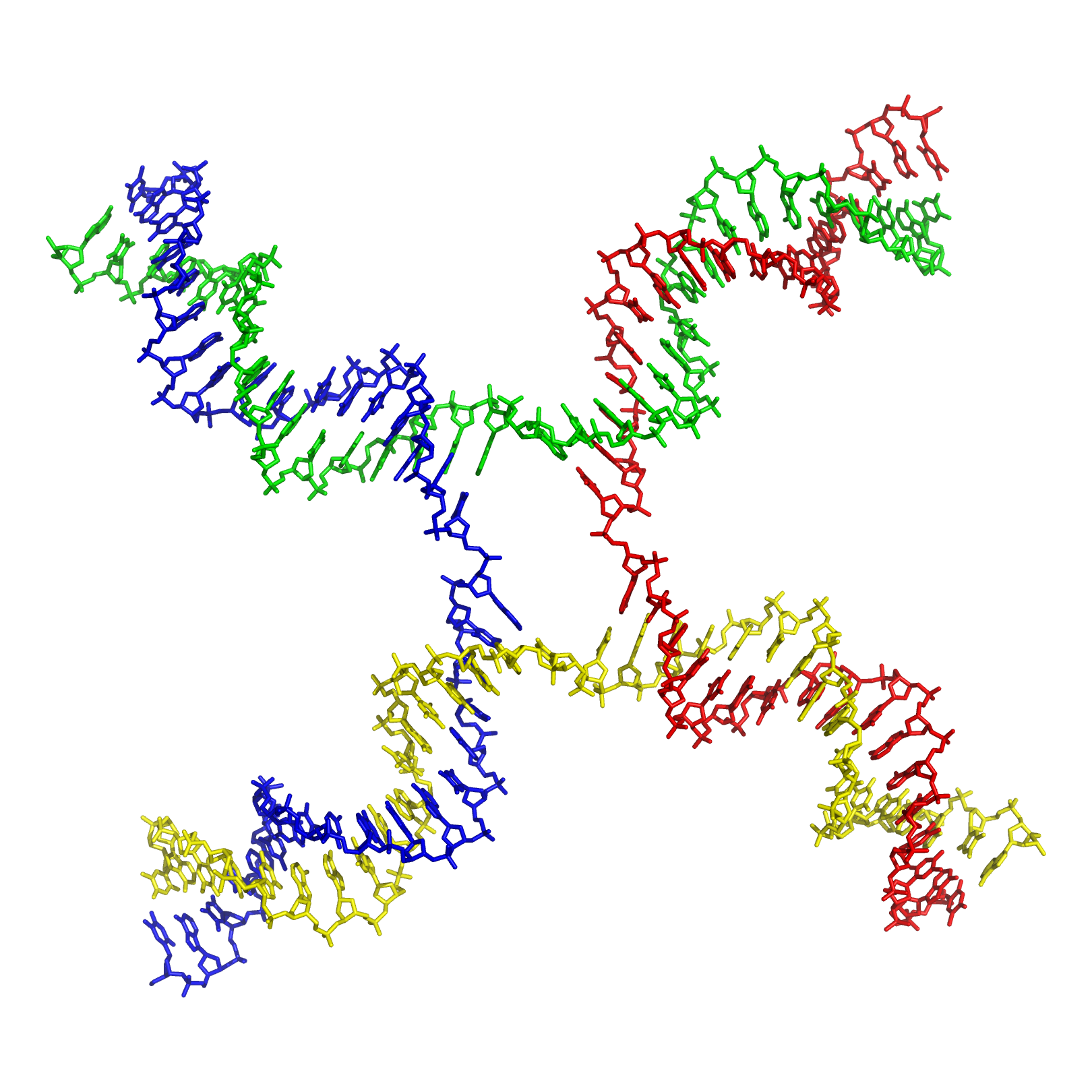
Molecular structure of a Holliday junction. From PDB: 3CRX.

=== MSH4 and MSH5 ===
The MSH4 and MSH5 proteins form a hetero-oligomeric structure (heterodimer) in yeast and humans. In the yeast Saccharomyces cerevisiae, MSH4 and MSH5 act specifically to facilitate crossovers between homologous chromosomes during meiosis. The MSH4/MSH5 complex binds and stabilizes double Holliday junctions and promotes their resolution into crossover products. An MSH4 hypomorphic (partially functional) mutant of S. cerevisiae showed a 30% genome-wide reduction in crossover numbers and a large number of meioses with non-exchange chromosomes. Nevertheless, this mutant gave rise to spore viability patterns suggesting that segregation of non-exchange chromosomes occurred efficiently. Thus in S. cerevisiae proper segregation apparently does not entirely depend on crossovers between homologous pairs. In humans, biallelic loss of function variants to MSH4 and MSH5 are compatible with life, but are associated with azoospermia in males (spermatogenic failure) and premature ovarian failure in females.

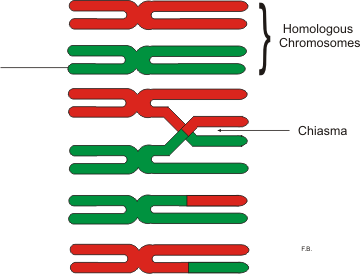
Chiasma is the point of crossing over of the arms of sister chromatids.

=== Chiasma ===
Chiasma (plural: chiasmata) are essential for the correct alignment and segregation of homologous chromosomes at meiosis I, and their frequency reflects the rate of genetic recombination, which contributes to variation among offspring. Chiasma number tends to increase with genome size, as larger genomes generally undergo more crossover events per meiosis. Each homologous pair forms a bivalent (or tetrad), consisting of four chromatids. The number and position of chiasmata influence the shape of bivalents, rod-shaped with one chiasma and ring-shaped with two or more.

The grasshopper Melanoplus femur-rubrum was exposed to an acute dose of X-rays during each individual stage of meiosis, and chiasma frequency was measured. Irradiation during the leptotene-zygotene stages of meiosis (that is, prior to the pachytene period in which crossover recombination occurs) was found to increase subsequent chiasma frequency. Similarly, in the grasshopper Chorthippus brunneus, exposure to X-irradiation during the zygotene-early pachytene stages caused a significant increase in mean cell chiasma frequency. Chiasma frequency was scored at the later diplotene-diakinesis stages of meiosis. These results show that ionising-radiation induced double-stranded DNA breaks were subsequently repaired by a crossover pathway leading to chiasma formation.

However, increased crossover frequency following radiation-induced DNA damage does not universally occur in all insects; for example, Drosophila females exhibit predominantly non-crossover repair pathways when responding to induced double-stranded DNA breaks, resulting in a relatively low ratio of crossovers to non-crossovers.

=== Class I and class II crossovers ===
Double-strand breaks are repaired by two pathways to generate crossovers in eukaryotes. The majority of them are repaired by MutL homologs MLH1 and MLH3, which defines the class I crossovers. The remaining are the result of the class II pathway, which is regulated by MUS81 endonuclease and FANCM translocase. There are interconnections between these two pathways—class I crossovers can compensate for the loss of class II pathway. In MUS81 knockout mice, class I crossovers are elevated, while total crossover counts at chiasmata are normal. However, the mechanisms underlining this crosstalk are not well understood. A recent study suggests that a scaffold protein called SLX4 may participate in this regulation. Specifically, SLX4 knockout mice largely phenocopies the MUS81 knockout—once again, an elevated class I crossovers while normal chiasmata count. In FANCM knockout mice, the class II pathway is hyperactivated, resulting in increased numbers of crossovers that are independent of the MLH1/MLH3 pathway.

== Consequences ==
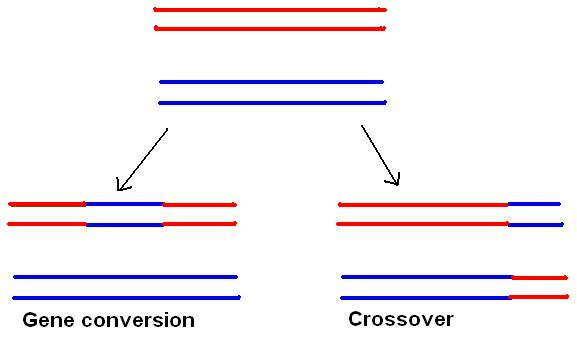
The difference between gene conversion and chromosomal crossover.

In most eukaryotes, a cell carries two versions of each gene, each referred to as an allele. Each parent passes on one allele to each offspring. An individual gamete inherits a complete haploid complement of alleles on chromosomes that are independently selected from each pair of chromatids lined up on the metaphase plate. Without recombination, all alleles for those genes linked together on the same chromosome would be inherited together. Meiotic recombination allows a more independent segregation between the two alleles that occupy the positions of single genes, as recombination shuffles the allele content between homologous chromosomes.

Recombination results in a new arrangement of maternal and paternal alleles on the same chromosome. Although the same genes appear in the same order, some alleles are different. In this way, it is theoretically possible to have any combination of parental alleles in an offspring, and the fact that two alleles appear together in one offspring does not have any influence on the statistical probability that another offspring will have the same combination. This principle of "independent assortment" of genes is fundamental to genetic inheritance. However, the frequency of recombination is actually not the same for all gene combinations. This leads to the notion of "genetic distance", which is a measure of recombination frequency averaged over a (suitably large) sample of pedigrees. Loosely speaking, one may say that this is because recombination is greatly influenced by the proximity of one gene to another. If two genes are located close together on a chromosome, the likelihood that a recombination event will separate these two genes is less than if they were farther apart. Genetic linkage describes the tendency of genes to be inherited together as a result of their location on the same chromosome. Linkage disequilibrium describes a situation in which some combinations of genes or genetic markers occur more or less frequently in a population than would be expected from their distances apart. This concept is applied when searching for a gene that may cause a particular disease. This is done by comparing the occurrence of a specific DNA sequence with the appearance of a disease. When a high correlation between the two is found, it is likely that the appropriate gene sequence is really closer

=== Recombination-associated mutagenesis ===
Although crossing over increases genetic variation by reshuffling existing alleles, the repair of programmed meiotic double-strand breaks can also introduce new mutations. In humans, sequencing of crossover molecules at recombination hotspots found that crossovers can carry more de novo mutations than nonrecombinant DNA molecules from the same donors and hotspots. Larger-scale analyses further suggest meiotic break repair can be strongly mutagenic, with especially large increases in rates of indels and structural variants per break. In plants, parent–progeny sequencing in Arabidopsis reported mutation rates elevated in proximity to crossover events.

== Non-homologous crossover ==
Crossovers typically occur between homologous regions of matching chromosomes, but similarities in sequence and other factors can result in mismatched alignments. Most DNA is composed of base pair sequences repeated very large numbers of times. These repetitious segments, often referred to as satellites, are fairly homogeneous among a species. During DNA replication, each strand of DNA is used as a template for the creation of new strands using a partially-conserved mechanism; proper functioning of this process results in two identical, paired chromosomes, often called sisters. Sister chromatid crossover events are known to occur at a rate of several crossover events per cell per division in eukaryotes. Most of these events involve an exchange of equal amounts of genetic information, but unequal exchanges may occur due to sequence mismatch. These are referred to by a variety of names, including non-homologous crossover, unequal crossover, and unbalanced recombination, and result in an insertion or deletion of genetic information into the chromosome. While rare compared to homologous crossover events, these mutations are drastic, affecting many loci at the same time. They are considered the main driver behind the generation of gene duplications and are a general source of mutation within the genome.

The specific causes of non-homologous crossover events are unknown, but several influential factors are known to increase the likelihood of an unequal crossover. One common vector leading to unbalanced recombination is the repair of double-strand breaks. Double-stranded DNA breaks are often repaired using homology directed repair, a process which involves invasion of a template strand by the double-stranded DNA break strand (see figure below). Nearby homologous regions of the template strand are often used for repair, which can give rise to either insertions or deletions in the genome if a non-homologous but complementary part of the template strand is used. Sequence similarity is a major player in crossover – crossover events are more likely to occur in long regions of close identity on a gene. This means that any section of the genome with long sections of repetitive DNA is prone to crossover events.

The presence of transposable elements is another influential element of non-homologous crossover. Repetitive regions of code characterize transposable elements; complementary but non-homologous regions are ubiquitous within transposons. Because chromosomal regions composed of transposons have large quantities of identical, repetitious code in a condensed space, it is thought that transposon regions undergoing a crossover event are more prone to erroneous complementary match-up; that is to say, a section of a chromosome containing a lot of identical sequences, should it undergo a crossover event, is less certain to match up with a perfectly homologous section of complementary code and more prone to binding with a section of code on a slightly different part of the chromosome. This results in unbalanced recombination, as genetic information may be either inserted or deleted into the new chromosome, depending on where the recombination occurred.

While the motivating factors behind unequal recombination remain obscure, elements of the physical mechanism have been elucidated. Mismatch repair (MMR) proteins, for instance, are a well-known regulatory family of proteins, responsible for regulating mismatched sequences of DNA during replication and escape regulation. The operative goal of MMRs is the restoration of the parental genotype. One class of MMR in particular, MutSβ, is known to initiate the correction of insertion-deletion mismatches of up to 16 nucleotides. Little is known about the excision process in eukaryotes, but E. coli excisions involve the cleaving of a nick on either the 5' or 3' strand, after which DNA helicase and DNA polymerase III bind and generate single-stranded proteins, which are digested by exonucleases and attached to the strand by ligase. Multiple MMR pathways have been implicated in the maintenance of complex organism genome stability, and any of many possible malfunctions in the MMR pathway result in DNA editing and correction errors. Therefore, while it is not certain precisely what mechanisms lead to errors of non-homologous crossover, it is extremely likely that the MMR pathway is involved.

== See also ==
- Unequal crossing over
- Coefficient of coincidence
- Genetic distance
- Independent assortment
- Mitotic crossover
- Recombinant frequency
