= Chromosome segregation =

Biological process

Chromosome segregation is the process in eukaryotes by which two sister chromatids formed as a consequence of DNA replication, or paired homologous chromosomes, separate from each other and migrate to opposite poles of the nucleus. This segregation process occurs during both mitosis and meiosis. Chromosome segregation also occurs in prokaryotes. However, in contrast to eukaryotic chromosome segregation, replication and segregation are not temporally separated. Instead segregation occurs progressively following replication.

== Mitotic chromatid segregation ==
Mitosis divides the chromosomes in a cell nucleus.

During mitosis chromosome segregation occurs routinely as a step in cell division (see mitosis diagram). As indicated in the mitosis diagram, mitosis is preceded by a round of DNA replication, so that each chromosome forms two copies called chromatids. These chromatids separate to opposite poles, a process facilitated by a protein complex referred to as cohesin. Upon proper segregation, a complete set of chromatids ends up in each of two nuclei, and when cell division is completed, each DNA copy previously referred to as a chromatid is now called a chromosome.

== Meiotic chromosome and chromatid segregation ==
Chromosome segregation occurs at two separate stages during meiosis called anaphase I and anaphase II (see meiosis diagram). In a diploid cell there are two sets of homologous chromosomes of different parental origin (e.g. a paternal and a maternal set). During the phase of meiosis labeled “interphase s” in the meiosis diagram there is a round of DNA replication, so that each of the chromosomes initially present is now composed of two copies called chromatids. These chromosomes (paired chromatids) then pair with the homologous chromosome (also paired chromatids) present in the same nucleus (see prophase I in the meiosis diagram). The process of alignment of paired homologous chromosomes is called synapsis (see Synapsis). During synapsis, genetic recombination usually occurs. Some of the recombination events occur by crossing over (involving physical exchange between two chromatids), but most recombination events involve information exchange but not physical exchange between two chromatids (see Synthesis-dependent strand annealing (SDSA)). Following recombination, chromosome segregation occurs as indicated by the stages metaphase I and anaphase I in the meiosis diagram.

Different pairs of chromosomes segregate independently of each other, a process termed “independent assortment of non-homologous chromosomes”. This process results in each gamete usually containing a mixture of chromosomes from both original parents.

Improper chromosome segregation (see non-disjunction, disomy) can result in aneuploid gametes having either too few or too many chromosomes.

The second stage at which segregation occurs during meiosis is prophase II (see meiosis diagram). During this stage, segregation occurs by a process similar to that during mitosis, except that in this case prophase II is not preceded by a round of DNA replication. Thus the two chromatids comprising each chromosome separate into different nuclei, so that each nucleus gets a single set of chromatids (now called chromosomes) and each nucleus becomes included in a haploid gamete (see stages following prophase II in the meiosis diagram). This segregation process is also facilitated by cohesin. Failure of proper segregation during prophase II can also lead to aneuploid gametes. Aneuploid gametes can undergo fertilization to form aneuploid zygotes and hence to serious adverse consequences for progeny.

== Crossovers facilitate segregation, but are not essential ==
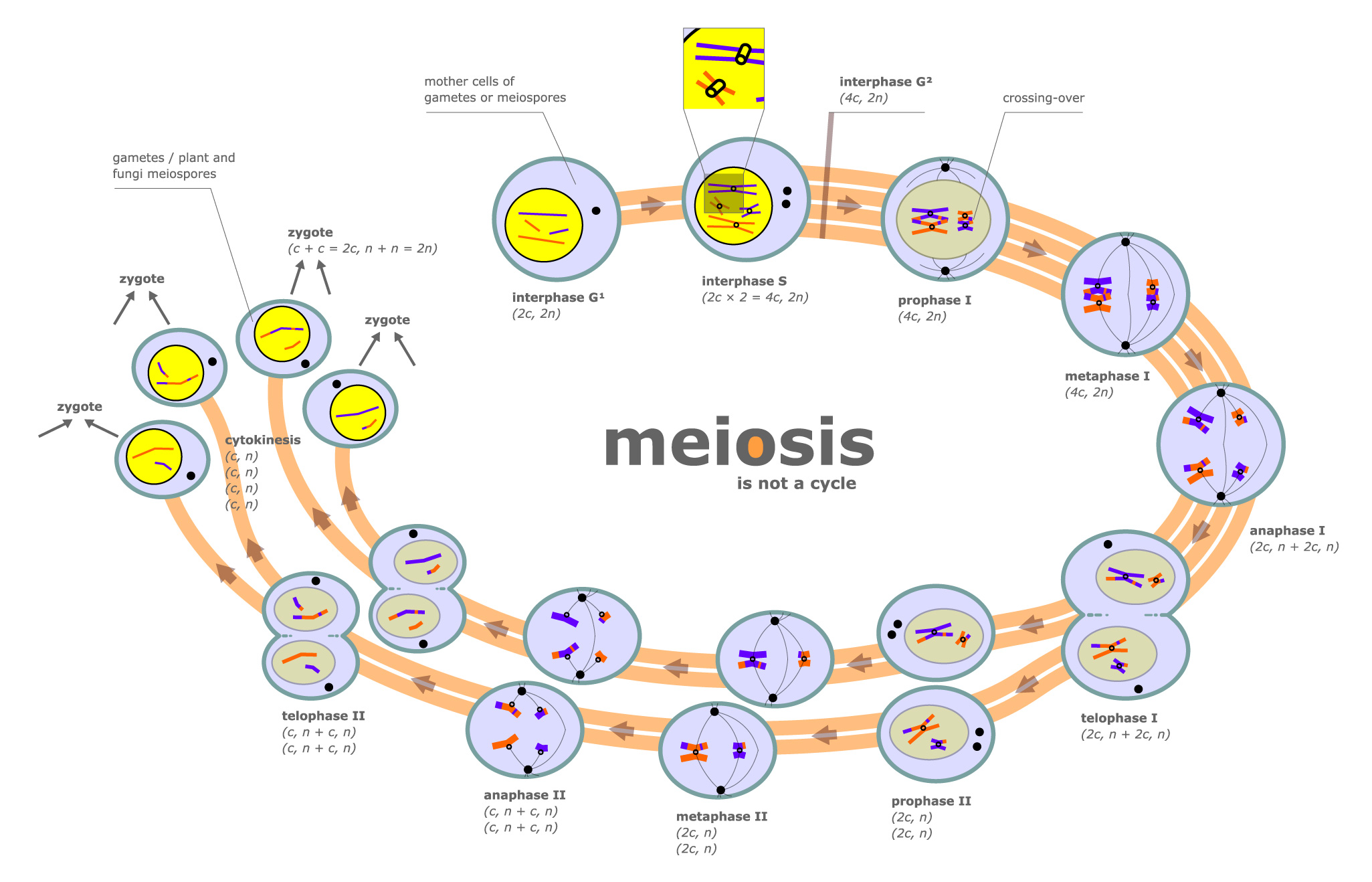
A diagram of the meiotic phases

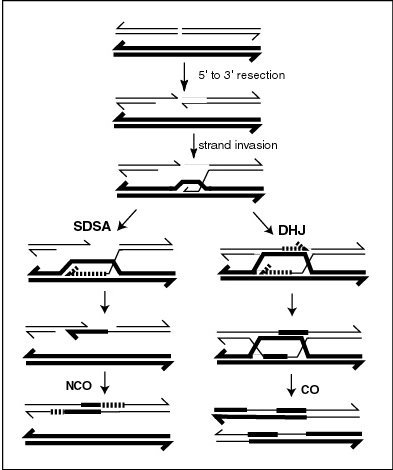
A current model of meiotic recombination, initiated by a double-strand break or gap, followed by pairing with an homologous chromosome and strand invasion to initiate the recombinational repair process. Repair of the gap can lead to crossover (CO) or non-crossover (NCO) of the flanking regions. CO recombination is thought to occur by the Double Holliday Junction (DHJ) model, illustrated on the right, above. NCO recombinants are thought to occur primarily by the Synthesis Dependent Strand Annealing (SDSA) model, illustrated on the left, above. Most recombination events appear to be the SDSA type.

Meiotic chromosomal crossover (CO) recombination facilitates the proper segregation of homologous chromosomes. This is because, at the end of meiotic prophase I, CO recombination provides a physical link that holds homologous chromosome pairs together. These linkages are established by chiasmata, which are the cytological manifestations of CO recombination. Together with cohesin linkage between sister chromatids, CO recombination may help ensure the orderly segregation of the paired homologous chromosomes to opposite poles. In support of this, a study of aneuploidy in single spermatozoa by whole genome sequencing found that, on average, human sperm cells with aneuploid autosomes exhibit significantly fewer crossovers than normal cells. After the first chromosome segregation in meiosis I is complete, there is further chromosome segregation during the second equational division of meiosis II. Both proper initial segregation of chromosomes in prophase I and the next chromosome segregation during equational division in meiosis II are required to generate gametes with the correct number of chromosomes.

CO recombinants are produced by a process involving the formation and resolution of Holliday junction intermediates. As indicated in the figure titled "A current model of meiotic recombination", the formation of meiotic crossovers can be initiated by a double-strand break (DSB). The introduction of DSBs in DNA often employs the topoisomerase-like protein SPO11. CO recombination may also be initiated by external sources of DNA damage such as X-irradiation, or internal sources.

There is evidence that CO recombination facilitates meiotic chromosome segregation. Other studies, however, indicate that chiasma, while supportive, are not essential to meiotic chromosome segregation. The budding yeast Saccharomyces cerevisiae is a model organism used for studying meiotic recombination. Mutants of S. cerevisiae defective in CO recombination at the level of Holliday junction resolution were found to efficiently undergo proper chromosome segregation. The pathway that produces the majority of COs in S. cerevisiae, and possibly in mammals, involves a complex of proteins including the MLH1-MLH3 heterodimer (called MutL gamma). MLH1-MLH3 binds preferentially to Holliday junctions. It is an endonuclease that makes single-strand breaks in supercoiled double-stranded DNA, and promotes the formation of CO recombinants. Double mutants deleted for both MLH3 (major pathway) and MMS4 (which is necessary for a minor Holliday junction resolution pathway) showed dramatically reduced crossing over compared to wild-type (6- to 17-fold reduction); however spore viability was reasonably high (62%) and chromosomal disjunction appeared mostly functional.

The MSH4 and MSH5 proteins form a hetero-oligomeric structure (heterodimer) in S. cerevisiae and humans. In S. cerevisiae, MSH4 and MSH5 act specifically to facilitate crossovers between homologous chromosomes during meiosis. The MSH4/MSH5 complex binds and stabilizes double Holliday junctions and promotes their resolution into crossover products. An MSH4 hypomorphic (partially functional) mutant of S. cerevisiae showed a 30% genome-wide reduction in crossover numbers, and a large number of meioses with non-exchange chromosomes. Nevertheless, this mutant gave rise to spore viability patterns suggesting that segregation of non-exchange chromosomes occurred efficiently. Thus it appears that CO recombination facilitates proper chromosome segregation during meiosis in S. cerevisiae, but it is not essential.

The fission yeast Schizosaccharomyces pombe has the ability to segregate homologous chromosomes in the absence of meiotic recombination (achiasmate segregation). This ability depends on the microtubule motor dynein that regulates the movement of chromosomes to the poles of the meiotic spindle.

== See also ==
- Cell cycle
- Non-random segregation of chromosomes
- Kinetochore
