= Bivalent (genetics) =

One pair of homologous chromosomes in a tetrad

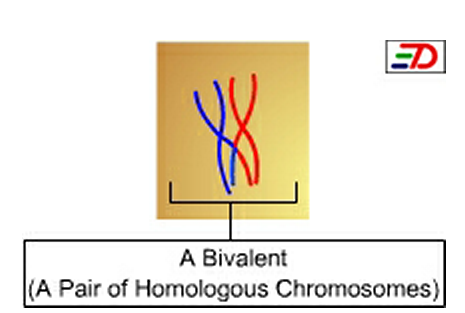
A bivalent

In cellular biology, a bivalent is one pair of chromosomes (homologous chromosomes) in a tetrad. A tetrad is the association of a pair of homologous chromosomes (4 sister chromatids) physically held together by at least one DNA crossover. This physical attachment allows for alignment and segregation of the homologous chromosomes in the first meiotic division.

== Formation ==
The formation of a bivalent occurs during the first division of meiosis (in the zygotene stage of meiotic prophase 1). In most organisms, each replicated chromosome (composed of two identical sister chromatids) elicits formation of DNA double-strand breaks during the leptotene phase. These breaks are repaired by homologous recombination, that uses the homologous chromosome as a template for repair. The search for the homologous target, helped by numerous proteins collectively referred as the synaptonemal complex, cause the two homologs to pair, between the leptotene and the pachytene phases of meiosis I. Resolution of the DNA recombination intermediate into a crossover exchanges DNA segments between the two homologous chromosomes at a site called a chiasma (plural: chiasmata). This physical strand exchange and the cohesion between the sister chromatids along each chromosome ensure robust pairing of the homologs in diplotene phase. The structure, visible by microscopy, is called a bivalent.

This molecular machinery is involved in gene expression regulation in cells. During early organismal development, the coordinated activation of diverse transcriptional programs shapes organs and tissues. Bivalent promoters and poised enhancers are regulatory regions decorated with histone marks associated with both positive and negative transcriptional outcomes. Finally, this review notes the potential link between bivalency and cancer, which may inform research in disease etiology and treatment.

== Structure ==
A bivalent is the association of two replicated homologous chromosomes having exchanged DNA strand in at least one site called chiasmata. Each bivalent contains a minimum of one chiasma and rarely more than three. This limited number (much lower than the number of initiated DNA breaks) is due to crossover interference, a poorly understood phenomenon that limits the number of resolution of repair events into crossover in the vicinity of another pre-existing crossover outcome, thereby limiting the total number of crossovers per homologs pair. Bivalent gene is a gene marked with both H3K4me3 and H3K27me3 epigenetic modification in the same area of this kind and is proposed to play a pivotal role related to pluripotency in embryonic stem (ES) cells. Bivalent promoters marked with both H3K27me3 and H3K4me3 histone modifications are characteristic of poised promoters in embryonic stem (ES) cells. The model of poised promoters postulates that bivalent chromatin in ES cells is resolved to Mono valency upon differentiation. With the availability of single-cell RNA sequencing (scRNA-seq) data, subsequent switches in transcriptional state at bivalent promoters can be studied more closely.
