= Interkinesis =

Interkinesis or interphase II is a period of rest that cells of some species enter during meiosis between meiosis I and meiosis II. No DNA replication occurs during interkinesis; however, replication does occur during the interphase I stage of meiosis (See meiosis I). During interkinesis, the spindles of the first meiotic division disassemble and the microtubules reassemble into two new spindles for the second meiotic division. Interkinesis follows telophase I; however, many plants skip telophase I and interkinesis, going immediately into prophase II. Each chromosome still consists of two chromatids. In this stage other organelle number may also increase.
