= Syndesis =

Syndesis may refer to:

- Arthrodesis, in orthopedic surgery
- Synapsis, in cell biology
