= Barbara Shalucha =

American educator

- Born: December 9, 1915; Springfield, Vermont, U.S.
- Died: May 10, 1992 (aged 76); Bloomington, Indiana, U.S.
- Occupations: Educator, botanist, college professor

Barbara Shalucha (December 9, 1915 – May 10, 1992) was an American science educator and a biology professor at Indiana University. She was founder and director of the Hilltop Garden and Nature Center in Bloomington.

== Early life and education ==
Shalucha was born in Springfield, Vermont, the daughter of Joseph Wasil Shalucha and Sophia Buda Shalucha. Her parents were immigrants from Russia. She graduated from the University of Vermont in 1937, and earned a master's degree there in 1938. At Vermont, she worked translating Russian agricultural publications into English. She completed doctoral studies in horticulture at the Ohio State University in 1947.

== Career ==
As a young woman, Shalucha taught at Connecticut College for Women, and in the children's gardening program at the Brooklyn Botanic Garden. She was a biology instructor and professor at Indiana University from 1948 until she retired in 1986. She managed the campus greenhouses, served on the board of the campus YWCA, and was president of the Women's Faculty Club from 1966 to 1967.

In Bloomington, Shalucha converted an acre of alfalfa field into the Hilltop Garden and Nature Center, a science education site for youth, and she was director of the center until 1986. "As I reflect, it has been a wonderful investment of my life," she told an interviewer in 1985. She also helped create a nature museum at McCormick's Creek State Park. In 1954 she went to Europe to study community gardens in Great Britain and Scandinavia. She chaired the City Beautification Committee. In 1963, she was appointed an advisor to the Washington Youth Garden Council. In 1985 she was a member of US/China Scientific Exchange Program, and toured botanical gardens in several Chinese cities. She was active in the AAUW and Girl Scouts, and spoke to community groups about gardening.

== Publications ==
Shalucha's research was published in scholarly journals including American Journal of Botany, Botanical Gazette, The Science Teacher, and Acta Horticulturae.

- "Extraction Methods in Relation to Hormone Content of Maize Endosperms" (1940, with George S. Avery Jr. and H. B. Creighton)
- "Expression of Hormone Yields in Relation to Different Avena Test Methods" (1941, with George S. Avery Jr. and H. B. Creighton)
- "The Total Extraction of Free Auxin and Auxin Precursor from Plant Tissue" (1941, with George S. Avery Jr. and Julius Berger)
- "Total Auxin Extraction from Wheat" (1942, with George S. Avery Jr. and Julius Berger)
- "Auxin Storage as Related to Endosperm Type in Maize" (1942, with George S. Avery Jr. and Julius Berger)
- "Auxin and nitrogen content of developing peach shoots" (1946)
- "Elementary Schools and Colleges Cooperate to Provide Garden Magic for Thousands More" (1953)
- "Garden Hilltop in Indiana" (1979)
- "People Want to Become Self-Sufficient Gardeners: The Beginnings with Youth" (1981)

== Personal life ==
Shalucha died from a heart attack in 1992, at the age of 76, in Bloomington. She was inducted into the Monroe County Hall of Fame posthumously, in 2000. Her paper are in the Indiana University Archives. Hilltop Gardens is now five acres and continues to offer youth gardening classes, seed kits, and other nature education programs.
