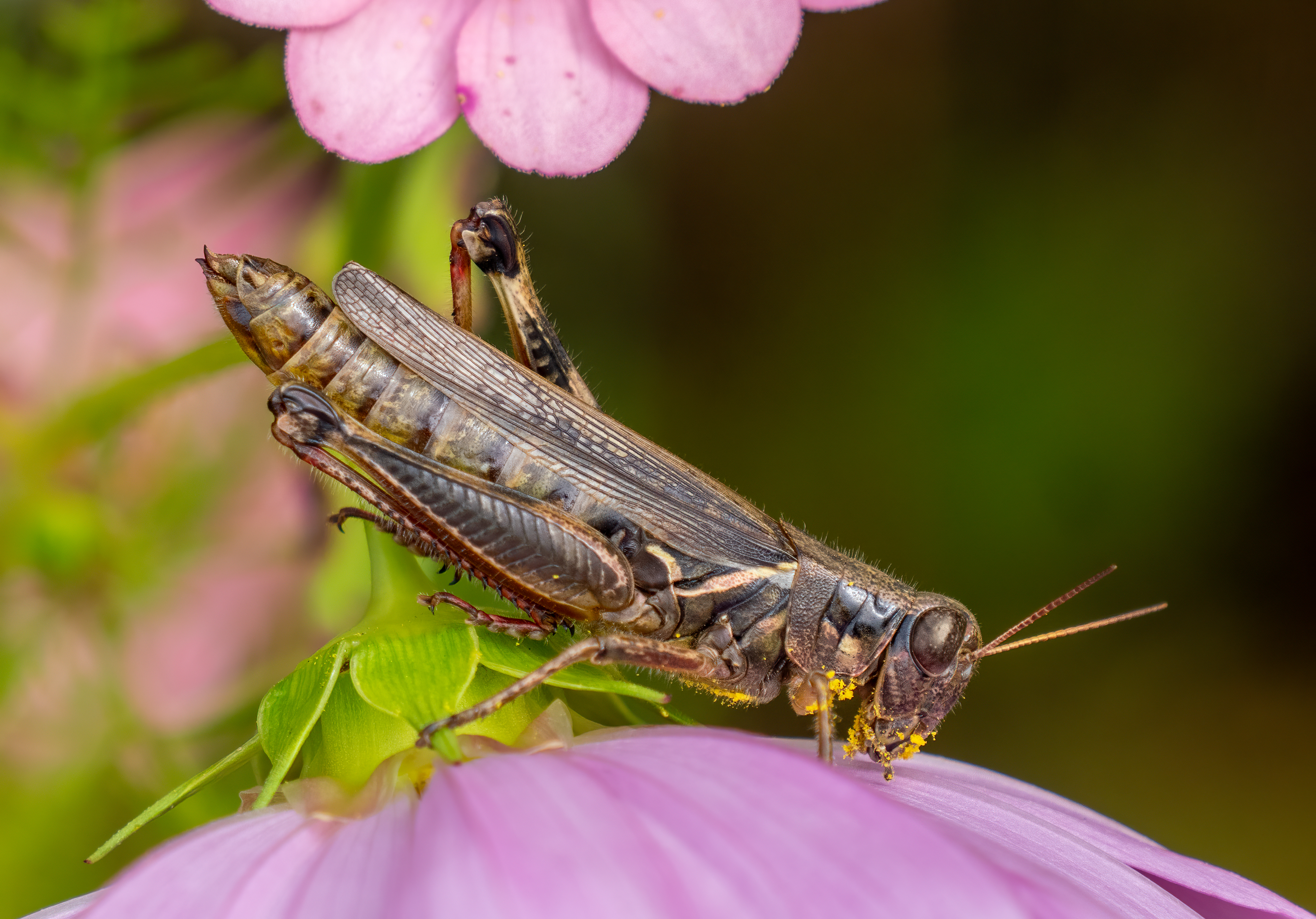

Scientific classification
- Kingdom: Animalia
- Phylum: Arthropoda
- Clade: Pancrustacea
- Class: Insecta
- Order: Orthoptera
- Suborder: Caelifera
- Family: Acrididae
- Genus: Melanoplus
- Species: M. femurrubrum

Binomial name
- Melanoplus femurrubrum (De Geer, 1773)

= Melanoplus femurrubrum =

Species of grasshopper

Melanoplus femurrubrum, the red-legged grasshopper, is a species of grasshopper belonging to the genus Melanoplus. It is one of the most common grasshoppers found in Mexico, the United States, and Canada. This grasshopper is frequently used as a model organism in scientific studies, due to their abundance throughout North America and behavioral response to changes in climate.

== Identification ==
Melanoplus femurrubrum is a medium-sized grasshopper, in which males can range in length from 1.7 cm (0.67 in) – 2.4 cm (0.94 in), whereas females can range from 1.8 cm (0.71 in) – 3.0 cm (1.2 in) long. This grasshopper has a reddish-brown back, a greenish-yellow belly, and red hind tibiae, hence its specific name femurrubrum (femur = thigh, rubrum = red). Wings of M. femurrubrum typically extend beyond the tip of the abdomen. Males have an enlarged abdomen, with a U-shaped sub-genital plate.

== Habitat ==
Melanoplus femurrubrum can be found in a variety of habitats found throughout most of North America, but prefer grasslands and areas of thick vegetation. They are commonly found in disturbed habitats and old fields.

== Life cycle ==
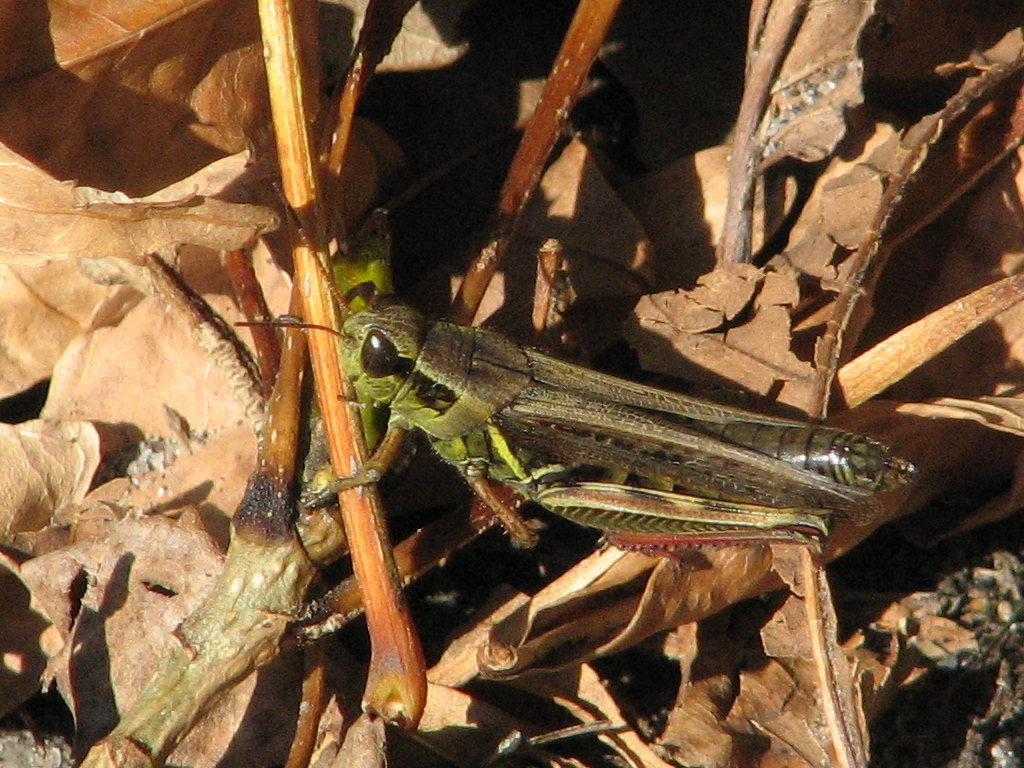
Ottawa, Ontario

Melanoplus femurrubrum, like other Orthoptera, undergo incomplete metamorphosis. This includes going through three stages of metamorphosis: egg, nymph, and adult. Adult female M. femurrubrum deposit eggs throughout autumn in the top 2 cm of the soil, where the eggs will develop until entering winter diapause. As the soil temperature increases during spring, the eggs will finish development and first instar nymphs will dig to the surface of the soil. M. femurrubrum nymphs will molt five to seven times before its final molt, in which they will be considered adults, having fully functioning wings and sexual organs. This species of grasshopper is univoltine, meaning they have one generation per growing season; however, in their southern distribution, adults and nymphs can be found throughout the year and may have more than one generation throughout the year.

== Diet ==
Melanoplus femurrubrum is a mixed-feeding herbivore, which means they can consume a variety of shrubs, forbs, and grasses to meet nutritional needs. This species dietary nutritional intake can vary depending on both abiotic and biotic factors. Consumption of plant macronutrient ratios of protein-carbohydrates fluctuate throughout the year to optimize available resources, and allows M. femurrubrum to compete with similar mix-feeding herbivores. Slight increases in temperature can increase food consumption, digestive efficiency, and metabolic rate of M. femurrubrum, which results in increased growth rates. In addition, M. femurrubrum will increase their plant carbohydrate intake and metabolic rate in the presence of predators, such as spiders.

At high densities, M. femurrubrum can be considered a pest of gardens and agricultural crops. This grasshopper can become a pest of grains, and includes soybeans, alfalfa, wheat, and barley, among others. Melanoplus species eat grasses of all kinds, as well as leafy and grassy agricultural crops and garden plants. They feed on the leaves, and sometimes fruit, flowers, and buds, as well as tree bark.

== Latitude and body size ==
At higher latitudes, the body size of Melanoplus femurrubrum decreases. In the colder region, there is a shorter growing season, which requires individuals to reach maturity at smaller sizes and develop faster so that they can reach the reproductive stage in one season. Melanoplus femurrubrum has more time to complete the development stage at larger body size in warmer sites.

== Research ==
M. femurrubrum was irradiated with an acute dose of X-rays during individual stages of meiosis, and chiasma frequency was measured. Irradiation during the leptotene-zygotene stages of meiosis (that is, prior to the pachytene period in which crossover recombination occurs) caused an increase in subsequent chiasma frequency. These results imply that X-irradiation induces DNA damages that are repaired during meiosis by a pathway leading to formation of chiasma.

== Gallery ==
Bloomington, Minnesota
