= Homologous chromosome =

Chromosomes that pair in fertilization

As this karyotype displays a diploid human cell contains 22 pairs of homologous chromosomes and 2 sex chromosomes. The cell has two sets of each chromosome; one of the pair is derived from the mother and the other from the father. The maternal and paternal chromosomes in a homologous pair have the same genes at the same locus, but possibly different alleles.

Homologous chromosomes or homologs are a set of one maternal and one paternal chromosome that pair up with each other inside a cell during meiosis. Homologs have the same genes in the same loci but possibly different alleles, where they provide points along each chromosome that enable a pair of chromosomes to align correctly with each other before separating during meiosis. This is the basis for Mendelian inheritance, which characterizes inheritance patterns of genetic material from an organism to its offspring parent developmental cell at the given time and area.

== Overview ==
Chromosomes are linear arrangements of condensed deoxyribonucleic acid (DNA) and histone proteins, which form a complex called chromatin. Homologous chromosomes are made up of chromosome pairs of approximately the same length, centromere position, and staining pattern, for genes with the same corresponding loci. One homologous chromosome is inherited from the organism's mother; the other is inherited from the organism's father. After meiosis occurs within the daughter cells, they have the correct number of genes which are a mix of the two parents' genes. In diploid (2n) organisms, the genome is composed of one set of each homologous chromosome pair, as compared to tetraploid organisms which may have two sets of each homologous chromosome pair. The alleles on the homologous chromosomes may be different, resulting in different phenotypes of the same genes. This mixing of maternal and paternal traits is enhanced by crossing over during meiosis, wherein lengths of chromosomal arms and the DNA they contain within a homologous chromosome pair are exchanged with one another.

== History ==
Early in the 1900s, William Bateson and Reginald Punnett were studying genetic inheritance and they noted that some combinations of alleles appeared more frequently than others. That data and information was further explored by Thomas Morgan. Using test cross experiments, he revealed that, for a single parent, the alleles of genes near to one another along the length of the chromosome move together. Using this logic he concluded that the two genes he was studying were located on homologous chromosomes. Later on during the 1930s, Harriet Creighton and Barbara McClintock were studying meiosis in corn cells and examining gene loci on corn chromosomes. Creighton and McClintock discovered that the new allele combinations present in the offspring and the event of crossing over were directly related. This proved interchromosomal genetic recombination.

== Structure ==
Homologous chromosomes are pairs of chromosomes in a diploid organism that have similar genes, although not necessarily identical. There are two main properties of homologous chromosomes: 1) the length of chromosomal arms and 2) the placement of the centromere.

The actual length of the arm, in accordance with the gene locations, is critically important for proper alignment. Centromere placement on the chromosome can be characterized by four main arrangements, either metacentric, submetacentric, acrocentric, or telocentric. Both of these properties (i.e., the length of chromosomal arms, and the placement of the chromosomal centromere) are the main factors for creating structural homology between chromosomes. Therefore, when two chromosomes containing the relatively same structure exist (e.g., maternal chromosome 15 and paternal chromosome 15), they are able to pair together via the process of synapsis to form homologous chromosomes.

Since homologous chromosomes are not identical and do not originate from the same organism, they are different from sister chromatids. Sister chromatids result after DNA replication has occurred, and thus are identical, side-by-side duplicates of each other.

=== In humans ===
Humans have a total of 46 chromosomes, but there are only 22 pairs of homologous autosomal chromosomes. The additional 23rd pair is the sex chromosomes, X and Y.

In humans, the 22 pairs of homologous autosomal chromosomes contain the same genes but may code for different traits in their allelic forms, as one was inherited from the mother and one from the father.

So, humans have two sets of 23 chromosomes in each cell that contains a nucleus. One set of 23 chromosomes (n) is from the parent ovum (22 autosomes, 1 sex chromosome (X only)) and one set of 23 chromosomes (n) is from the parent spermatozoon (22 autosomes, 1 sex chromosome (X or Y)). Ultimately, this means that humans are diploid (2n) organisms.

== Functions ==
Homologous chromosomes are important in the processes of meiosis and mitosis. They allow for the recombination and random segregation of genetic material from the mother and father into new cells.

=== In meiosis ===
During the process of meiosis, homologous chromosomes can recombine and produce new combinations of genes in the daughter cells.

Sorting of homologous chromosomes during meiosis.

Meiosis is a round of two cell divisions that results in four haploid daughter cells that each contain half the number of chromosomes as the parent cell. It reduces the chromosome number in a germ cell by half by first separating the homologous chromosomes in meiosis I and then the sister chromatids in meiosis II. The process of meiosis I is generally longer than meiosis II because it takes more time for the chromatin to replicate and for the homologous chromosomes to be properly oriented and segregated by the processes of pairing and synapsis in meiosis I. During meiosis, genetic recombination (by random segregation) and crossing over produces daughter cells that each contain different combinations of maternally and paternally coded genes. This recombination of genes allows for the introduction of new allele pairings and genetic variation. Genetic variation among organisms helps make a population more stable by providing a wider range of genetic traits for natural selection to act on.

==== Prophase I ====
In prophase I of meiosis I, each chromosome is aligned with its homologous partner and pairs completely. In prophase I, the DNA has already undergone replication so each chromosome consists of two identical chromatids connected by a common centromere. During the zygotene stage of prophase I, the homologous chromosomes pair up with each other. This pairing occurs by a synapsis process where the synaptonemal complex – a protein scaffold – is assembled and joins the homologous chromosomes along their lengths. Cohesin crosslinking occurs between the homologous chromosomes and helps them resist being pulled apart until anaphase. Genetic crossing-over, a type of recombination, occurs during the pachytene stage of prophase I. In addition, another type of recombination referred to as synthesis-dependent strand annealing (SDSA) frequently occurs. SDSA recombination involves information exchange between paired homologous chromatids, but not physical exchange. SDSA recombination does not cause crossing-over.

In the process of crossing-over, genes are exchanged by the breaking and union of homologous portions of the chromosomes' lengths. Structures called chiasmata are the site of the exchange. Chiasmata physically link the homologous chromosomes once crossing over occurs and throughout the process of chromosomal segregation during meiosis. Both the non-crossover and crossover types of recombination function as processes for repairing DNA damage, particularly double-strand breaks. At the diplotene stage of prophase I the synaptonemal complex disassembles before which will allow the homologous chromosomes to separate, while the sister chromatids stay associated by their centromeres.

==== Metaphase I ====
In metaphase I of meiosis I, the pairs of homologous chromosomes, also known as bivalents or tetrads, line up in a random order along the metaphase plate. The random orientation is another way for cells to introduce genetic variation. Meiotic spindles emanating from opposite spindle poles attach to each of the homologs (each pair of sister chromatids) at the kinetochore.

==== Anaphase I ====
In anaphase I of meiosis I the homologous chromosomes are pulled apart from each other. The homologs are cleaved by the enzyme separase to release the cohesin that held the homologous chromosome arms together. This allows the chiasmata to release and the homologs to move to opposite poles of the cell. The homologous chromosomes are now randomly segregated into two daughter cells that will undergo meiosis II to produce four haploid daughter germ cells.

==== Meiosis II ====
After the tetrads of homologous chromosomes are separated in meiosis I, the sister chromatids from each pair are separated. The two haploid daughter cells (the number of chromosomes has been reduced to half: earlier two sets of chromosomes were present, but now each set exists in two different daughter cells that have arisen from the single diploid parent cell by meiosis I) resulting from meiosis I undergo another cell division in meiosis II but without another round of chromosomal replication. The sister chromatids in the two daughter cells are pulled apart during anaphase II by nuclear spindle fibers, resulting in four haploid daughter cells.

=== In mitosis ===
Homologous chromosomes do not function the same in mitosis as they do in meiosis. Prior to every single mitotic division a cell undergoes, the chromosomes in the parent cell replicate themselves. The homologous chromosomes within the cell will ordinarily not pair up and undergo genetic recombination with each other. Instead, the replicants, or sister chromatids, will line up along the metaphase plate and then separate in the same way as meiosis II – by being pulled apart at their centromeres by nuclear mitotic spindles. If any crossing over does occur between sister chromatids during mitosis, it does not produce any new recombinant genotypes.

=== In somatic cells ===
Homologous pairing in most contexts will refer to germline cells, however also takes place in somatic cells. For example, in humans, somatic cells have very tightly regulated homologous pairing (separated into chromosomal territories, and pairing at specific loci under control of developmental signalling). Other species however (notably Drosophila) exhibit homologous pairing much more frequently. In Drosophila the homologous pairing supports a gene regulatory phenomenon called transvection in which an allele on one chromosome affects the expression of the homologous allele on the homologous chromosome. One notable function of this is the sexually dimorphic regulation of X-linked genes.

== Problems ==
1. Meiosis I 2. Meiosis II 3. Fertilization 4. Zygote Nondisjunction is when chromosomes fail to separate normally resulting in a gain or loss of chromosomes. In the left image the blue arrow indicates nondisjunction taking place during meiosis II. In the right image the green arrow is indicating nondisjunction taking place during meiosis I.

There are severe repercussions when chromosomes do not segregate properly. Faulty segregation can lead to fertility problems, embryo death, birth defects, and cancer. Though the mechanisms for pairing and adhering homologous chromosomes vary among organisms, proper functioning of those mechanisms is imperative in order for the final genetic material to be sorted correctly.

=== Nondisjunction ===
Proper homologous chromosome separation in meiosis I is crucial for sister chromatid separation in meiosis II. A failure to separate properly is known as nondisjunction. There are two main types of nondisjunction that occur: trisomy and monosomy. Trisomy is caused by the presence of one additional chromosome in the zygote as compared to the normal number, and monosomy is characterized by the presence of one fewer chromosome in the zygote as compared to the normal number. If this uneven division occurs in meiosis I, then none of the daughter cells will have proper chromosomal distribution and non-typical effects can ensue, including Down syndrome. Unequal division can also occur during the second meiotic division. Nondisjunction which occurs at this stage can result in normal daughter cells and deformed cells.

== Other uses ==
Diagram of the general process for double-stranded break repair as well as synthesis-dependent strand annealing.

While the main function of homologous chromosomes is their use in nuclear division, they are also used in repairing double-strand breaks of DNA. These double-stranded breaks may occur in replicating DNA and are most often the result of interaction of DNA with naturally occurring damaging molecules such as reactive oxygen species. Homologous chromosomes can repair this damage by aligning themselves with chromosomes of the same genetic sequence. Once the base pairs have been matched and oriented correctly between the two strands, the homologous chromosomes perform a process that is very similar to recombination, or crossing over as seen in meiosis. Part of the intact DNA sequence overlaps with that of the damaged chromosome's sequence. Replication proteins and complexes are then recruited to the site of damage, allowing for repair and proper replication to occur. Through this functioning, double-strand breaks can be repaired and DNA can function normally.

== Relevant research ==
Current and future research on the subject of homologous chromosome is heavily focused on the roles of various proteins during recombination or during DNA repair. In a recently published article by Pezza et al. the protein known as HOP2 is responsible for both homologous chromosome synapsis as well as double-strand break repair via homologous recombination. The deletion of HOP2 in mice has large repercussions in meiosis. Other current studies focus on specific proteins involved in homologous recombination as well.

There is ongoing research concerning the ability of homologous chromosomes to repair double-strand DNA breaks. Researchers are investigating the possibility of exploiting this capability for regenerative medicine. This medicine could be very prevalent in relation to cancer, as DNA damage is thought to be contributor to carcinogenesis. Manipulating the repair function of homologous chromosomes might allow for bettering a cell's damage response system. While research has not yet confirmed the effectiveness of such treatment, it may become a useful therapy for cancer.

== See also ==
- Homologous recombination
- Mendelian inheritance
- Developmental biology
- Synapsis
- Non-disjunction
- Heredity
