= U2OS cell line =

Human osteosarcoma cell line

U2OS is the name of a partially differentiated human osteosarcoma (OS) cell line. U2OS cells were derived from the tibial bone of a 15-year-old female patient with osteosarcoma by scientists Jan Pontén (affiliated with Uppsala University) and Dr. Eero Saksela (affiliated with University of Helsinki at the time) in 1964.

U2OS cells exhibit epithelial morphology, meaning that they still maintain some of their epithelial properties, despite being cancerous in nature. Some of these properties can include having organized layers, distinct cellular boundaries, and possessing tight junctions.

U2OS cells have been used in cancer research, drug development, apoptosis studies, genetic research, and radiation oncology studies.
