= Harriet Creighton =

American geneticist

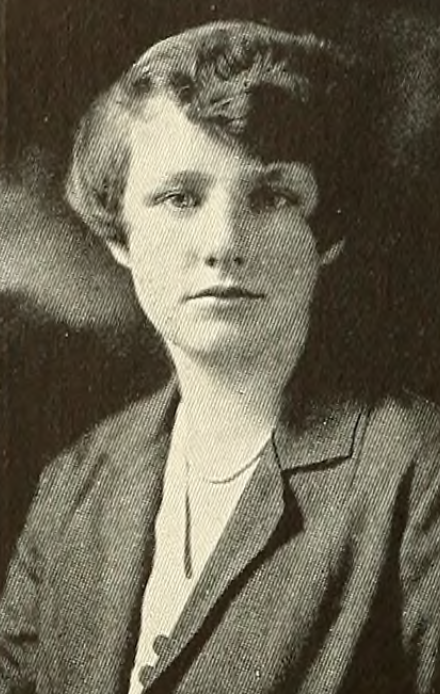
- Harriet Creighton, from the 1929 yearbook of Wellesley College
- Born: June 27, 1909; Delavan, Illinois, U.S.
- Died: January 9, 2004 (aged 94); Needham, Massachusetts, U.S.
- Education: Wellesley College, Cornell University (Ph.D. 1933)
- Known for: Describing chromosomal crossover
- Scientific career
- Fields: Botany, genetics, education
- Institutions: Cornell University, Connecticut College, Wellesley College
- Doctoral advisor: Barbara McClintock

Harriet Baldwin Creighton (June 27, 1909 – January 9, 2004) was an American botanist, geneticist and educator. She worked with Barbara McClintock on cytogenetics in the 1930s, and was elected president of the Botanical Society of America in 1956.

== Early life and education ==
Creighton was born in Delavan, Illinois, the daughter of Cyrus Murray Creighton and Bertha Baldwin Creighton. Her father was born in Canada. She graduated from Wellesley College in 1929, where she found botanist Margaret Clay Ferguson an encouraging faculty mentor.

She completed her Ph.D. at Cornell University in 1933. At Cornell, she worked in the field of maize cytogenetics with Barbara McClintock. The pair published an influential paper in 1931, in which they described chromosomal crossover for the first time. This paper, part of her Ph.D. research, provided key evidence that chromosomes carried and exchanged genetic information and hence that genes for physical traits are carried on chromosomes.

== Career ==
After completing her doctoral studies, Creighton taught at Cornell University and Connecticut College, and then returned to Wellesley College where she taught until her retirement in 1974. During World War II, she took leave from teaching to serve in the U.S. Navy.

Creighton was elected in 1940 a fellow of the American Association for the Advancement of Science. In 1956 she was elected president of the Botanical Society of America. She held two Fulbright lectureships, which took her to the University of Western Australia in 1952, and to the Cusco, Peru, in 1959.

== Publications ==
- "A Correlation of Cytological and Genetical Crossing-Over in Zea mays" (1931, with Barbara McClintock)
- "Three Cases of Deficiency in Chromosome 9 of Zea mays" (1934)
- "Production and Distribution of Growth Hormone in Shoots of Aesculus and Malus, and Its Probable Role in Stimulating Cambial Activity" (1937, with George S. Avery Jr. and Paul R. Burkholder)
- "Nutrient Deficiencies and Growth Hormone Concentration in Helianthus and Nicotiana" (1937, with George S. Avery Jr. and Paul R. Burkholder)
- "Extraction Methods in Relation to Hormone Content of Maize Endosperms" (1940, with George S. Avery Jr. and Barbara Shalucha)
- "Expression of Hormone Yields in Relation to Different Avena Test Methods" (1941, with George S. Avery Jr. and Barbara Shalucha)

== Personal life and legacy ==
Creighton's companion later in life was Gertrude Dever; they met in the WAVES and lived together for many years. Creighton died in 2004, at the age of 94, in Needham, Massachusetts. Wellesley College has a collection of her personal papers. Creighton's close personal and professional relationship with Barbara McClintock was dramatized in a 2023 play by Carolyn Gage, In McClintock's Corn.
