= Chiasma (genetics) =

Point of contact among homologous chromosomes

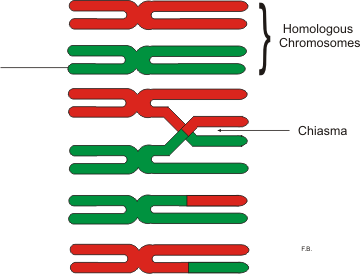
Crossing over during meiosis, with chiasma shown.

In genetics, a chiasma (pl.: chiasmata) is the point of contact, the physical link, between two (non-sister) chromatids belonging to homologous chromosomes. At a given chiasma, an exchange of genetic material can occur between both chromatids, what is called a chromosomal crossover, but this is much more frequent during meiosis than mitosis. In meiosis, absence of a chiasma generally results in improper chromosomal segregation and aneuploidy.

Points of crossing over become visible as chiasmata after the synaptonemal complex disassembles and the homologous chromosomes are slightly apart from each other.

The phenomenon of genetic chiasmata (chiasmatypie) was discovered and described in 1909 by Frans Alfons Janssens, a Professor at the University of Leuven in Belgium.

Following synapsis, each homologous pair of synapsed chromosomes consists of four chromatids called a tetrad, this is referred to interchangeably as a bivalent, which is one pair of chromosomes. As the tetrad begins to split in diplotene, the only points of contact are at the chiasmata. The chiasmata become visible during the diplotene stage of prophase I of meiosis, but the actual "crossing-overs" of genetic material are thought to occur during the previous pachytene stage. Sister chromatids also form chiasmata between each other (also known as a chi structure), but because their genetic material is identical, it does not cause any noticeable change in the resulting daughter cells.

In humans, there seems to be one chiasma per chromosome arm, and in mammals, the number of chromosome arms is a good predictor of the number of crossovers. Yet, in humans and possibly other species, evidence shows that the number of crossovers is regulated at the level of an entire chromosome and not an arm.

The grasshopper Melanoplus femurrubrum was exposed to an acute dose of X-rays during each individual stage of meiosis, and chiasma frequency was measured. Irradiation during the leptotene-zygotene stages of meiosis, that is, prior to the pachytene period in which crossover recombination occurs, was found to increase subsequent chiasma frequency. Similarly, in the grasshopper Chorthippus brunneus, exposure to X-irradiation during the zygotene-early pachytene stages caused a significant increase in mean cell chiasma frequency. Chiasma frequency was scored at the later diplotene-diakinesis stages of meiosis. These results show that ionizing radiation-induced double stranded DNA breaks (DSBs) were subsequently repaired by a crossover pathway leading to chiasma formation.

== See also ==
- Genetic recombination
- Holocentric chromosome
