= Meiosis =

Cell division producing haploid gametes

In meiosis, the chromosomes duplicate (during interphase) and homologous chromosomes exchange genetic information (chromosomal crossover) during the first division, called meiosis I. The daughter cells divide again in meiosis II, splitting up sister chromatids to form haploid gametes. Two gametes fuse during fertilization, forming a diploid cell (zygote) with a complete set of paired chromosomes.

Meiosis (/maɪˈoʊsɪs/) (Note: from Ancient Greek μείωσις meíōsis 'lessening', since it is a reductional division.) is a special type of cell division of germ cells in sexually-reproducing organisms that produces the gametes: the sperm or egg cells. It involves two rounds of division that ultimately result in four cells, each with only one copy of each chromosome (haploid). Additionally, prior to the division, genetic material from the paternal and maternal copies of each chromosome is crossed over, creating new combinations of code on each chromosome. Later on, during fertilisation, the haploid cells produced by meiosis from a male and a female will fuse to create a zygote, a cell with two copies of each chromosome. In mammals, the process of meiosis finishes only after fertilization so the product is a zygote.

Errors in meiosis resulting in aneuploidy (an abnormal number of chromosomes) are the leading known cause of miscarriage and the most frequent genetic cause of developmental disabilities.

In meiosis, DNA replication is followed by two rounds of cell division to produce four daughter cells, each with half the number of chromosomes as the original parent cell. The two meiotic divisions are known as meiosis I and meiosis II. Before meiosis begins, during S phase of the cell cycle, the DNA of each chromosome is replicated so that it consists of two identical sister chromatids, which remain held together through sister chromatid cohesion. This S-phase can be referred to as "premeiotic S-phase" or "meiotic S-phase". Immediately following DNA replication, meiotic cells enter a prolonged G_{2}-like stage known as meiotic prophase. During this time, homologous chromosomes pair with each other and undergo genetic recombination, a programmed process in which DNA may be cut and then repaired, which allows them to exchange some of their genetic information. A subset of recombination events results in crossovers, which create physical links known as chiasmata (singular: chiasma, for the Greek letter Chi, Χ) between the homologous chromosomes. In most organisms, these links can help direct each pair of homologous chromosomes to segregate away from each other during meiosis II, resulting in two haploid cells that have half the number of chromosomes as the parent cell.

During meiosis II, the cohesion between sister chromatids is released and they segregate from one another, as during mitosis. In some cases, all four of the meiotic products form gametes such as sperm, spores or pollen. In female animals, three of the four meiotic products are typically eliminated by extrusion into polar bodies, and only one cell develops to produce an ovum. Because the number of chromosomes is halved during meiosis, gametes can fuse (i.e., fertilization) to form a diploid zygote that contains two copies of each chromosome, one from each parent. Thus, alternating cycles of meiosis and fertilization enable sexual reproduction, with successive generations maintaining the same number of chromosomes. For example, diploid human cells contain 23 pairs of chromosomes including 1 pair of sex chromosomes (46 total), half of maternal origin and half of paternal origin. Meiosis produces haploid gametes (ova or sperm) that contain one set of 23 chromosomes. When two gametes (an egg and a sperm) fuse, the resulting zygote is once again diploid, with the mother and father each contributing 23 chromosomes. This same pattern, but not the same number of chromosomes, occurs in all organisms that utilize meiosis.

Meiosis occurs in all sexually reproducing single-celled and multicellular organisms (which are all eukaryotes), including animals, plants, and fungi. It is an essential process for oogenesis and spermatogenesis.

== Overview ==
Although the process of meiosis is related to the more general cell division process of mitosis, it differs in two important respects:

Recombination	Meiosis	Shuffles the genes between the two chromosomes in each pair (one received from each parent), producing lots of recombinant chromosomes with unique genetic combinations in every gamete
Recombination	Mitosis	Occurs only if needed to repair DNA damage; Usually occurs between identical sister chromatids and does not result in genetic changes
Chromosome number (ploidy)	Meiosis	Produces four genetically unique cells, each with half the number of chromosomes as in the parent
Chromosome number (ploidy)	Mitosis	Produces two genetically identical cells, each with the same number of chromosomes as in the parent

Meiosis begins with a diploid cell, which contains two copies of each chromosome, termed homologs. First, the cell undergoes DNA replication, so each homolog now consists of two identical sister chromatids. Then each set of homologs pair with each other and exchange genetic information by homologous recombination often leading to physical connections (crossovers) between the homologs. In the first meiotic division, the homologs are segregated to separate daughter cells by the spindle apparatus. The cells then proceed to a second division without an intervening round of DNA replication. The sister chromatids are segregated to separate daughter cells to produce a total of four haploid cells. Female animals employ a slight variation on this pattern and produce one large ovum and three small polar bodies. Because of recombination, an individual chromatid can consist of a new combination of maternal and paternal genetic information, resulting in offspring that are genetically distinct from either parent. Furthermore, an individual gamete can include an assortment of maternal, paternal, and recombinant chromatids. This genetic diversity resulting from sexual reproduction contributes to the variation in traits upon which natural selection can act.

Meiosis uses many of the same mechanisms as mitosis, the type of cell division used by eukaryotes to divide one cell into two identical daughter cells. In some plants, fungi, and protists meiosis results in the formation of spores: haploid cells that can divide vegetatively without undergoing fertilization. Some eukaryotes, like bdelloid rotifers, do not have the ability to carry out meiosis and have acquired the ability to reproduce by parthenogenesis.

Meiosis does not occur in archaea or bacteria, which generally reproduce asexually via binary fission. However, a "sexual" process known as horizontal gene transfer involves the transfer of DNA from one bacterium or archaeon to another and recombination of these DNA molecules of different parental origin.

== History ==
Meiosis was discovered and described for the first time in sea urchin eggs in 1876 by the German biologist Oscar Hertwig. It was described again in 1883, at the level of chromosomes, by the Belgian zoologist Edouard Van Beneden, in Ascaris roundworm eggs. The significance of meiosis for reproduction and inheritance, however, was described only in 1890 by German biologist August Weismann, who noted that two cell divisions were necessary to transform one diploid cell into four haploid cells if the number of chromosomes had to be maintained. In 1911, the American geneticist Thomas Hunt Morgan detected crossovers in meiosis in the fruit fly Drosophila melanogaster, which helped to establish that genetic traits are transmitted on chromosomes.

The term "meiosis" is derived from the Greek word μείωσις, meaning 'lessening'. It was introduced to biology by J.B. Farmer and J.E.S. Moore in 1905, using the idiosyncratic rendering "maiosis":

We propose to apply the terms Maiosis or Maiotic phase to cover the whole series of nuclear changes included in the two divisions that were designated as Heterotype and Homotype by Flemming.

The spelling was changed to "meiosis" by Koernicke (1905) and by Pantel and De Sinety (1906) to follow the usual conventions for transliterating Greek.

== Phases ==
Meiosis is divided into meiosis I and meiosis II which are further divided into Karyokinesis I, Cytokinesis I, Karyokinesis II, and Cytokinesis II, respectively. The preparatory steps that lead up to meiosis are identical in pattern and name to interphase of the mitotic cell cycle. Interphase is divided into three phases:

- Growth 1 (G_{1}) phase: In this very active phase, the cell synthesizes its vast array of proteins, including the enzymes and structural proteins it will need for growth. In G_{1}, each of the chromosomes consists of a single linear molecule of DNA.
- Synthesis (S) phase: The genetic material is replicated; each of the cell's chromosomes duplicates to become two identical sister chromatids attached at a centromere. This replication does not change the ploidy of the cell since the centromere number remains the same. The identical sister chromatids have not yet condensed into the densely packaged chromosomes visible with the light microscope. This will take place during prophase I in meiosis.
- Growth 2 (G_{2}) phase: G_{2} phase as seen before mitosis is not present in meiosis. Meiotic prophase corresponds most closely to the G_{2} phase of the mitotic cell cycle.

Interphase is followed by meiosis I and then meiosis II. Meiosis I separates replicated homologous chromosomes, each still made up of two sister chromatids, into two daughter cells, thus reducing the chromosome number by half. During meiosis II, sister chromatids decouple, and the resultant daughter chromosomes are segregated into four daughter cells. For diploid organisms, the daughter cells resulting from meiosis are haploid and contain only one copy of each chromosome. In some species, cells enter a resting phase known as interkinesis between meiosis I and meiosis II.

Meiosis I and II are each divided into prophase, metaphase, anaphase, and telophase stages, similar in purpose to their analogous subphases in the mitotic cell cycle. Therefore, meiosis includes the stages of meiosis I (prophase I, metaphase I, anaphase I, telophase I) and meiosis II (prophase II, metaphase II, anaphase II, telophase II).

Diagram of the meiotic phases

During meiosis, specific genes are more highly transcribed. In addition to strong meiotic stage-specific expression of mRNA, there are also pervasive translational controls (e.g. selective usage of preformed mRNA), regulating the ultimate meiotic stage-specific protein expression of genes during meiosis. Thus, both transcriptional and translational controls determine the broad restructuring of meiotic cells needed to carry out meiosis.

=== Meiosis I ===
Meiosis I segregates homologous chromosomes, which are joined as tetrads (2n, 4c), producing two haploid cells (n chromosomes, 23 in humans) which each contain chromatid pairs (1n, 2c). Because the ploidy is reduced from diploid to haploid, meiosis I is referred to as a reductional division. Meiosis II is an equational division analogous to mitosis, in which the sister chromatids are segregated, creating four haploid daughter cells (1n, 1c).

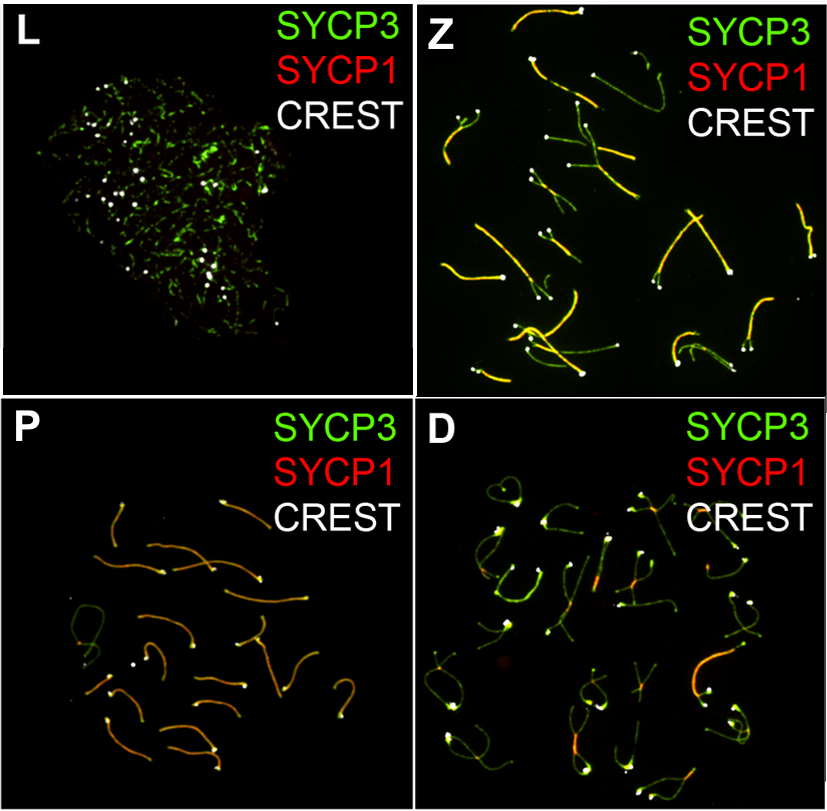
Meiosis Prophase I in mice. In Leptotene (L), the axial elements (stained by SYCP3) begin to form. In Zygotene (Z), the transverse elements (SYCP1) and central elements of the synaptonemal complex are partially installed (appearing as yellow as they overlap with SYCP3). In Pachytene (P), it is fully installed except on the sex chromosomes. In Diplotene (D), it disassembles revealing chiasmata. CREST marks the centromeres.

Schematic of the synaptonemal complex at different stages of prophase I and the chromosomes arranged as a linear array of loops.

==== Prophase I ====
Prophase I is by far the longest phase of meiosis (lasting 13 out of 14 days in mice). During prophase I, homologous maternal and paternal chromosomes pair, synapse, and exchange genetic information (by homologous recombination), forming at least one crossover per chromosome. These crossovers become visible as chiasmata (plural; singular chiasma). This process facilitates stable pairing between homologous chromosomes and hence enables accurate segregation of the chromosomes at the first meiotic division. The paired and replicated chromosomes are called bivalents (two chromosomes) or tetrads (four chromatids), with one chromosome coming from each parent. Prophase I is divided into a series of substages which are named according to the appearance of chromosomes.

===== Leptotene =====
The first stage of prophase I is the leptotene stage, also known as leptonema, from Greek words meaning "thin threads". In this stage of prophase I, individual chromosomes—each consisting of two replicated sister chromatids—become "individualized" to form visible strands within the nucleus. The chromosomes each form a linear array of loops mediated by cohesin, and the lateral elements of the synaptonemal complex assemble forming an "axial element" from which the loops emanate. Recombination is initiated in this stage by the enzyme SPO11 which creates programmed double strand breaks (around 300 per meiosis in mice). This process generates single stranded DNA filaments coated by RAD51 and DMC1 which invade the homologous chromosomes, forming inter-axis bridges, and resulting in the pairing/co-alignment of homologues (to a distance of ~400 nm in mice).

===== Zygotene =====
Leptotene is followed by the zygotene stage, also known as zygonema, from Greek words meaning "paired threads", which in some organisms is also called the bouquet stage because of the way the telomeres cluster at one end of the nucleus. In this stage the homologous chromosomes become much more closely (~100 nm) and stably paired (a process called synapsis) mediated by the installation of the transverse and central elements of the synaptonemal complex. Synapsis is thought to occur in a zipper-like fashion starting from a recombination nodule. The paired chromosomes are called bivalent or tetrad chromosomes.

===== Pachytene =====
The pachytene stage (/ˈpækɪtiːn/ PAK-i-teen), also known as pachynema, from Greek words meaning "thick threads". is the stage at which all autosomal chromosomes have synapsed. In this stage homologous recombination, including chromosomal crossover (crossing over), is completed through the repair of the double strand breaks formed in leptotene. Most breaks are repaired without forming crossovers resulting in gene conversion. However, a subset of breaks (at least one per chromosome) form crossovers between non-sister (homologous) chromosomes resulting in the exchange of genetic information. The exchange of information between the homologous chromatids results in a recombination of information; each chromosome has the complete set of information it had before, and there are no gaps formed as a result of the process. Because the chromosomes cannot be distinguished in the synaptonemal complex, the actual act of crossing over is not perceivable through an ordinary light microscope, and chiasmata are not visible until the next stage.

===== Diplotene =====
During the diplotene stage, also known as diplonema, from Greek words meaning "two threads", the synaptonemal complex disassembles and homologous chromosomes separate from one another a little. However, the homologous chromosomes of each bivalent remain tightly bound at chiasmata, the regions where crossing-over occurred. The chiasmata remain on the chromosomes until they are severed at the transition to anaphase I to allow homologous chromosomes to move to opposite poles of the cell.

In human fetal oogenesis, all developing oocytes develop to this stage and are arrested in prophase I before birth. This suspended state is referred to as the dictyotene stage or dictyate. It lasts until meiosis is resumed to prepare the oocyte for ovulation, which happens at puberty or even later.

===== Diakinesis =====
Chromosomes condense further during the diakinesis stage, from Greek words meaning "moving through". This is the first point in meiosis where the four parts of the tetrads are actually visible. Sites of crossing over entangle together, effectively overlapping, making chiasmata clearly visible. Other than this observation, the rest of the stage closely resembles prometaphase of mitosis; the nucleoli disappear, the nuclear membrane disintegrates into vesicles, and the meiotic spindle begins to form.

===== Meiotic spindle formation =====
Unlike mitotic cells, human and mouse oocytes do not have centrosomes to produce the meiotic spindle. In mice, approximately 80 microtubule organizing centers (MTOCs) form a sphere in the ooplasm and begin to nucleate microtubules that reach out towards chromosomes, attaching to the chromosomes at the kinetochore. Over time, the MTOCs merge until two poles have formed, generating a barrel shaped spindle. In human oocytes spindle microtubule nucleation begins on the chromosomes, forming an aster that eventually expands to surround the chromosomes. Chromosomes then slide along the microtubules towards the equator of the spindle, at which point the chromosome kinetochores form end-on attachments to microtubules.

==== Metaphase I ====
Homologous pairs move together along the metaphase plate: As kinetochore microtubules from both spindle poles attach to their respective kinetochores, the paired homologous chromosomes align along an equatorial plane that bisects the spindle, due to continuous counterbalancing forces exerted on the bivalents by the microtubules emanating from the two kinetochores of homologous chromosomes. This attachment is referred to as a bipolar attachment. The physical basis of the independent assortment of chromosomes is the random orientation of each bivalent along with the metaphase plate, with respect to the orientation of the other bivalents along the same equatorial line. The protein complex cohesin holds sister chromatids together from the time of their replication until anaphase I. In mitosis, the force of kinetochore microtubules pulling in opposite directions creates tension. The cell senses this tension and does not progress with anaphase until all the chromosomes are properly bi-oriented. In meiosis, establishing tension ordinarily requires at least one crossover per chromosome pair in addition to cohesin between sister chromatids. (see Chromosome segregation)

==== Anaphase I ====
Kinetochore microtubules shorten, pulling homologous chromosomes (which each consist of a pair of sister chromatids) to opposite poles. Non-kinetochore microtubules lengthen, pushing the centrosomes farther apart. The cell elongates in preparation for division down the center. Unlike in mitosis, only the cohesin from the chromosome arms is degraded while the cohesin surrounding the centromere remains protected by a protein named Shugoshin (Japanese for "guardian spirit"), which prevents the sister chromatids from separating. This allows the sister chromatids to remain together while homologs are segregated.

==== Telophase I ====
The first meiotic division effectively ends when the chromosomes arrive at the poles. Each daughter cell now has half the number of chromosomes but each chromosome consists of a pair of chromatids. The microtubules that make up the spindle network disappear, and a new nuclear membrane surrounds each haploid set. Cytokinesis, the pinching of the cell membrane in animal cells or the formation of the cell wall in plant cells, occurs, completing the creation of two daughter cells. However, cytokinesis does not fully complete, resulting in "cytoplasmic bridges" which enable the cytoplasm to be shared between daughter cells until the end of meiosis II. Sister chromatids remain attached during telophase I.

Cells may enter a period of rest known as interkinesis or interphase II. No DNA replication occurs during this stage.

=== Meiosis II ===
Meiosis II is the second meiotic division, and usually involves equational segregation, or separation of sister chromatids. Mechanically, the process is similar to mitosis, though its genetic results are fundamentally different. The result is the production of four haploid cells (n chromosomes; 23 in humans) from the two haploid cells (with n chromosomes, each consisting of two sister chromatids) produced in meiosis I. The four main steps of meiosis II are: prophase II, metaphase II, anaphase II, and telophase II.

In prophase II, the disappearance of the nucleoli and the nuclear envelope is seen again as well as the shortening and thickening of the chromatids. Centrosomes move to the polar regions and arrange spindle fibers for the second meiotic division.

In metaphase II, the centromeres contain two kinetochores that attach to spindle fibers from the centrosomes at opposite poles. The new equatorial metaphase plate is rotated by 90 degrees when compared to meiosis I, perpendicular to the previous plate.

This is followed by anaphase II, in which the remaining centromeric cohesin, not protected by Shugoshin anymore, is cleaved, allowing the sister chromatids to segregate. The sister chromatids by convention are now called sister chromosomes as they move toward opposing poles.

The process ends with telophase II, which is similar to telophase I, and is marked by decondensation and lengthening of the chromosomes and the disassembly of the spindle. Nuclear envelopes re-form and cleavage or cell plate formation eventually produces a total of four daughter cells, each with a haploid set of chromosomes.

Meiosis is now complete and ends up with four new daughter cells.

== Origin and function ==
=== Origin of meiosis ===
Meiosis appears to be a fundamental characteristic of eukaryotic organisms and to have been present early in eukaryotic evolution. Eukaryotes that were once thought to lack meiotic sex have recently been shown to likely have, or once have had, this capability. As one example, Giardia intestinalis, a common intestinal parasite, was previously considered to have descended from a lineage that predated the emergence of meiosis and sex. However, G. intestinalis has now been found to possess a core set of meiotic genes, including five meiosis specific genes. Also evidence for meiotic recombination, indicative of sexual reproduction, was found in G. intestinalis. Another example of organisms previously thought to be asexual are parasitic protozoa of the genus Leishmania, which cause human disease. However, these organisms were shown to have a sexual cycle consistent with a meiotic process. Although amoeba were once generally regarded as asexual, evidence has been presented that most lineages are anciently sexual and that the majority of asexual groups probably arose recently and independently. Dacks and Rogers proposed, based on a phylogenetic analysis, that facultative sex was likely present in the common ancestor of eukaryotes.

=== Genetic variation ===
The new combinations of DNA created during meiosis are a significant source of genetic variation alongside mutation, resulting in new combinations of alleles, which may be beneficial. Meiosis generates gamete genetic diversity in two ways: (1) Law of Independent Assortment. The independent orientation of homologous chromosome pairs along the metaphase plate during metaphase I and orientation of sister chromatids in metaphase II, this is the subsequent separation of homologs and sister chromatids during anaphase I and II, it allows a random and independent distribution of chromosomes to each daughter cell (and ultimately to gametes); and (2) Crossing Over. The physical exchange of homologous chromosomal regions by homologous recombination during prophase I results in new combinations of genetic information within chromosomes. However, such physical exchange does not always occur during meiosis. In the oocytes of the silkworm Bombyx mori, meiosis is completely achiasmate (lacking crossovers). Although synaptonemal complexes are present during the pachytene stage of meiosis in B. mori, crossing-over homologous recombination is absent between the paired chromosomes.

=== Prophase I arrest ===
Female mammals and birds are born possessing all the oocytes needed for future ovulations, and these oocytes are arrested at the prophase I stage of meiosis. In humans, as an example, oocytes are formed between three and four months of gestation within the fetus and are therefore present at birth. During this prophase I arrested stage (dictyate), which may last for decades, four copies of the genome are present in the oocytes. The arrest of ooctyes at the four genome copy stage was proposed to provide the informational redundancy needed to repair damage in the DNA of the germline. The repair process used appears to involve homologous recombinational repair Prophase I arrested oocytes have a high capability for efficient repair of DNA damage, particularly exogenously induced double-strand breaks. DNA repair capability appears to be a key quality control mechanism in the female germ line and a critical determinant of fertility.

=== Meiosis as an adaptation for repairing germline DNA ===
Genetic recombination can be viewed as fundamentally a DNA repair process, and that when it occurs during meiosis it is an adaptation for repairing the genomic DNA that is passed on to progeny. Experimental findings indicate that a substantial benefit of meiosis is recombinational repair of DNA damage in the germline, as indicated by the following examples. Hydrogen peroxide is an agent that causes oxidative stress leading to oxidative DNA damage. Treatment of the yeast Schizosaccharomyces pombe with hydrogen peroxide increased the frequency of mating and the formation of meiotic spores by 4 to 18-fold. Volvox carteri, a haploid multicellular, facultatively sexual green algae, can be induced by heat shock to reproduce by meiotic sex. This induction can be inhibited by antioxidants indicating that the induction of meiotic sex by heat shock is likely mediated by oxidative stress leading to increased DNA damage.

== Occurrence ==
=== In life cycles ===
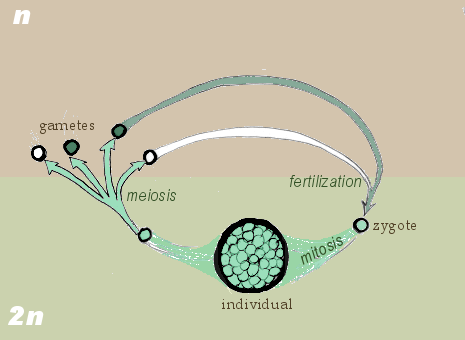
Diplontic life cycle

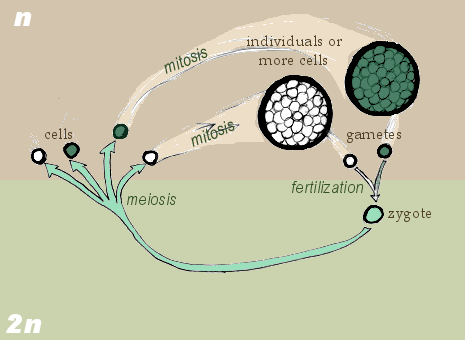
Haplontic life cycle.

Meiosis occurs in eukaryotic life cycles involving sexual reproduction, consisting of the cyclical process of growth and development by mitotic cell division, production of gametes by meiosis and fertilization. At certain stages of the life cycle, germ cells produce gametes. Somatic cells make up the body of the organism and are not involved in gamete production.

Cycling meiosis and fertilization events results in alternation between haploid and diploid states. The organism phase of the life cycle can occur either during the diploid state (diplontic life cycle), during the haploid state (haplontic life cycle), or both (haplodiplontic life cycle), in which there are two distinct organism phases, one with haploid cells and the other with diploid cells.

In the diplontic life cycle (with pre-gametic meiosis), as in humans, the organism is multicellular and diploid, grown by mitosis from a diploid cell called the zygote. The organism's diploid germ-line stem cells undergo meiosis to make haploid gametes (the spermatozoa in males and ova in females), which fertilize to form the zygote. The diploid zygote undergoes repeated cellular division by mitosis to grow into the organism.

In the haplontic life cycle (with post-zygotic meiosis), the organism is haploid, by the proliferation and differentiation of a single haploid cell called the gamete. Two organisms of opposing sex contribute their haploid gametes to form a diploid zygote. The zygote undergoes meiosis immediately, creating four haploid cells. These cells undergo mitosis to create the organism. Many fungi and many protozoa utilize the haplontic life cycle.

In the haplodiplontic life cycle (with sporic or intermediate meiosis), the living organism alternates between haploid and diploid states. Consequently, this cycle is also known as the alternation of generations. The diploid organism's germ-line cells undergo meiosis to produce spores. The spores proliferate by mitosis, growing into a haploid organism. The haploid organism's gamete then combines with another haploid organism's gamete, creating the zygote. The zygote undergoes repeated mitosis and differentiation to produce a new diploid organism. The haplodiplontic life cycle can be considered a fusion of the diplontic and haplontic life cycles.

=== In plants and animals ===
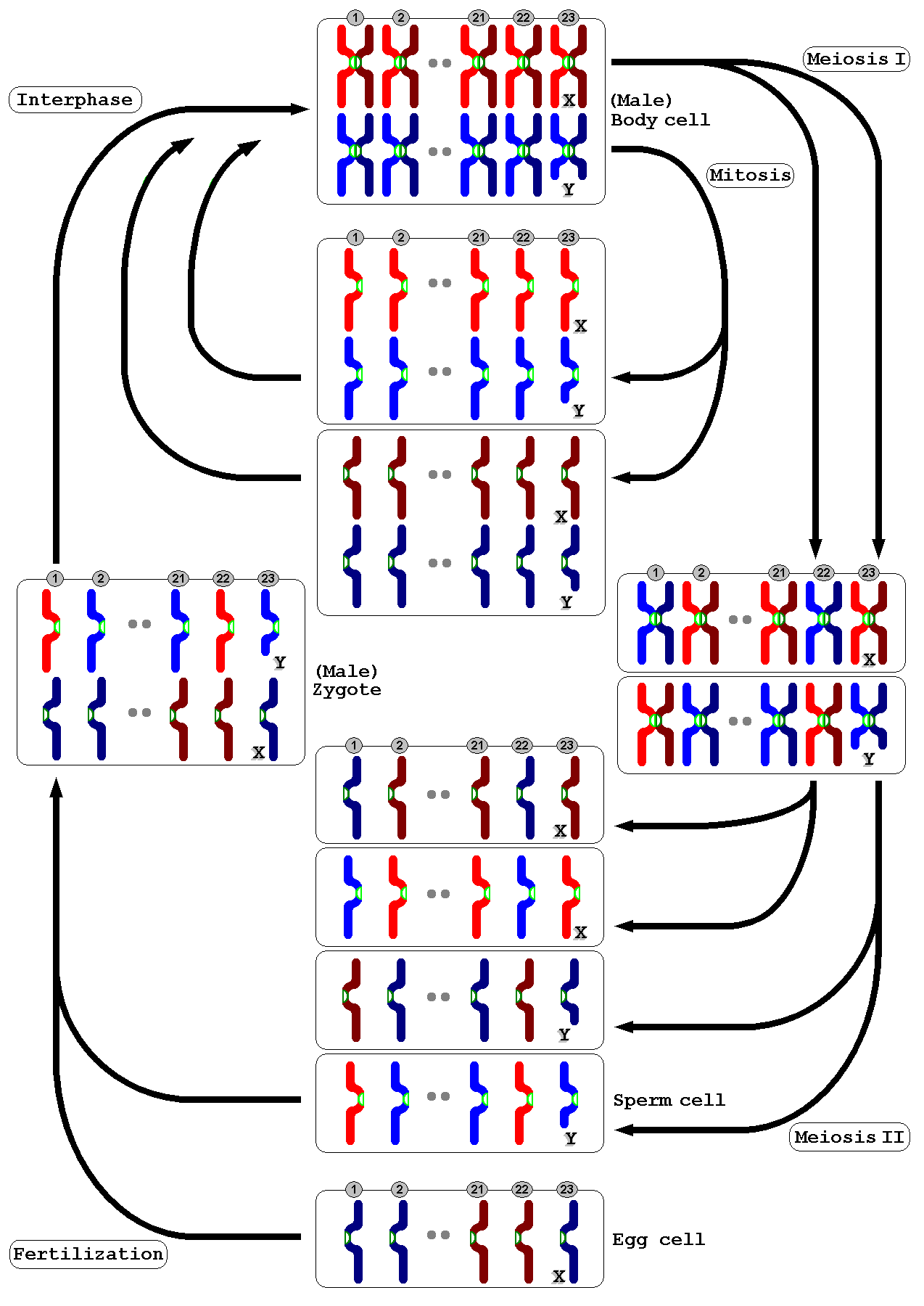
Overview of chromatides' and chromosomes' distribution within the mitotic and meiotic cycle of a male human cell

Meiosis occurs in all animals and plants. The result, the production of gametes with half the number of chromosomes as the parent cell, is the same, but the detailed process is different. In animals, meiosis produces gametes directly. In land plants and some algae, there is an alternation of generations such that meiosis in the diploid sporophyte generation produces haploid spores instead of gametes. When they germinate, these spores undergo repeated cell division by mitosis, developing into a multicellular haploid gametophyte generation, which then produces gametes directly (i.e. without further meiosis).

In both animals and plants, the final stage is for the gametes to fuse to form a zygote in which the original number of chromosomes is restored.

=== In mammals ===
In females, meiosis occurs in cells known as oocytes (singular: oocyte). Each primary oocyte divides twice in meiosis, unequally in each case. The first division produces a daughter cell, and a much smaller polar body which may or may not undergo a second division. In meiosis II, division of the daughter cell produces a second polar body, and a single haploid cell, which enlarges to become an ovum. Therefore, in females each primary oocyte that undergoes meiosis results in one mature ovum and two or three polar bodies.

There are pauses during meiosis in females. Maturing oocytes are arrested in prophase I of meiosis I and lie dormant within a protective shell of somatic cells called the follicle. At this stage, the oocyte nucleus is called the germinal vesicle. At the beginning of each menstrual cycle, FSH secretion from the anterior pituitary stimulates a few follicles to mature in a process known as folliculogenesis. During this process, the maturing oocytes resume meiosis and continue until metaphase II of meiosis II, where they are again arrested just before ovulation. The breakdown of the germinal vesicle, condensation of chromosomes, and assembly of the bipolar metaphase I spindle are all clear indications that meiosis has resumed. If these oocytes are fertilized by sperm, they will resume and complete meiosis. During folliculogenesis in humans, usually one follicle becomes dominant while the others undergo atresia. The process of meiosis in females occurs during oogenesis, and differs from the typical meiosis in that it features a long period of meiotic arrest known as the dictyate stage and lacks the assistance of centrosomes.

In males, meiosis occurs during spermatogenesis in the seminiferous tubules of the testicles. Meiosis during spermatogenesis is specific to a type of cell called spermatocytes, which will later mature to become spermatozoa. Meiosis of primordial germ cells happens at the time of puberty, much later than in females. Tissues of the male testis suppress meiosis by degrading retinoic acid, proposed to be a stimulator of meiosis. This is overcome at puberty when cells within seminiferous tubules called Sertoli cells start making their own retinoic acid. Sensitivity to retinoic acid is also adjusted by proteins called nanos and DAZL. Genetic loss-of-function studies on retinoic acid-generating enzymes have shown that retinoic acid is required postnatally to stimulate spermatogonia differentiation which results several days later in spermatocytes undergoing meiosis, however retinoic acid is not required during the time when meiosis initiates.

In female mammals, meiosis begins immediately after primordial germ cells migrate to the ovary in the embryo. Some studies suggest that retinoic acid derived from the primitive kidney (mesonephros) stimulates meiosis in embryonic ovarian oogonia and that tissues of the embryonic male testis suppress meiosis by degrading retinoic acid. However, genetic loss-of-function studies on retinoic acid-generating enzymes have shown that retinoic acid is not required for initiation of either female meiosis which occurs during embryogenesis or male meiosis which initiates postnatally.

=== Flagellates ===
While the majority of eukaryotes have a two-divisional meiosis (though sometimes achiasmatic), a very rare form, one-divisional meiosis, occurs in some flagellates (parabasalids and oxymonads) from the gut of the wood-feeding cockroach Cryptocercus.

== Role in human genetics and disease ==
Recombination among the 23 pairs of human chromosomes is responsible for redistributing not just the actual chromosomes, but also pieces of each of them. There is also an estimated 1.6-fold more recombination in females relative to males. In addition, average, female recombination is higher at the centromeres and male recombination is higher at the telomeres. On average, 1 million bp (1 Mb) correspond to 1 cMorgan (cm = 1% recombination frequency). The frequency of cross-overs remain uncertain. In yeast, mouse and human, it has been estimated that ≥200 double-strand breaks (DSBs) are formed per meiotic cell. However, only a subset of DSBs (~5–30% depending on the organism), go on to produce crossovers, which would result in only 1–2 cross-overs per human chromosome.

In humans, recombination rates differ between maternal and paternal DNA:

- Maternal DNA: Recombines approximately 42 times on average.
- Paternal DNA: Recombines approximately 27 times on average.

=== Nondisjunction ===
Errors during meiosis, particularly nondisjunction, can result in gametes with an abnormal number of chromosomes, potentially leading to chromosomal disorders.

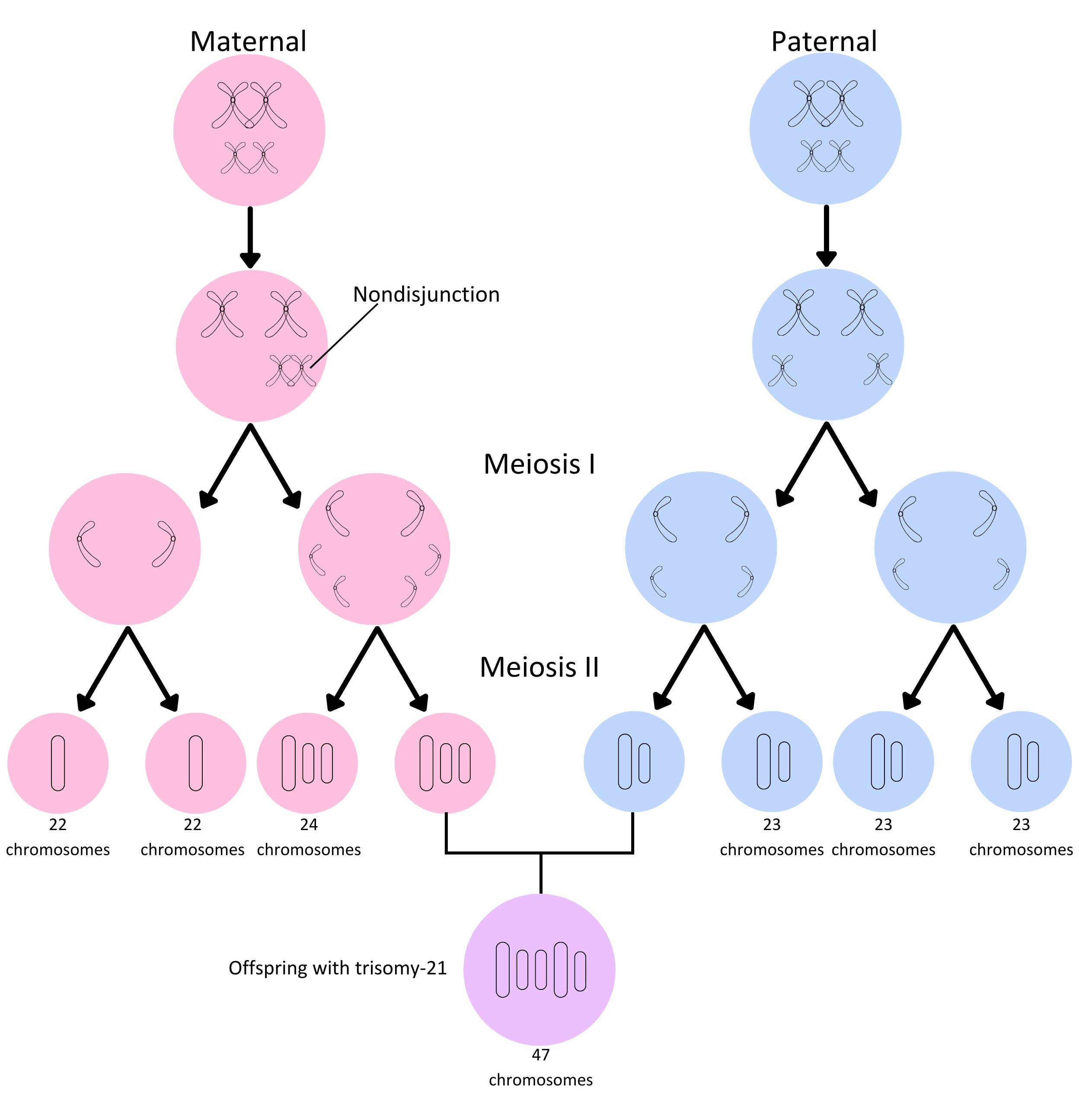
A diagram depicting nondisjunction in the maternal cell during the Meiosis I phase, resulting in gametes with an extra chromosome. Through fertilization of this egg, an offspring with the condition trisomy 21 is produced.

The normal separation of chromosomes in meiosis I or sister chromatids in meiosis II is termed disjunction. When the segregation is not normal, it is called nondisjunction. This results in the production of gametes which have either too many or too few of a particular chromosome, and is a common mechanism for trisomy or monosomy. Nondisjunction can occur in the meiosis I or meiosis II, phases of cellular reproduction, or during mitosis.

Most monosomic and trisomic human embryos are not viable, but some aneuploidies can be tolerated, such as trisomy for the smallest chromosome, chromosome 21. Phenotypes of these aneuploidies range from severe developmental disorders to asymptomatic. Medical conditions include but are not limited to:

- Down syndrome – trisomy of chromosome 21
- Patau syndrome – trisomy of chromosome 13
- Edwards syndrome – trisomy of chromosome 18
- Klinefelter syndrome – extra X chromosomes in males – i.e. XXY, XXXY, XXXXY, etc.
- Turner syndrome – lacking of one X chromosome in females – i.e. X0
- Triple X syndrome – an extra X chromosome in females
- Jacobs syndrome – an extra Y chromosome in males.

The probability of nondisjunction in human oocytes increases with increasing maternal age, presumably due to loss of cohesin over time.

== Comparison to mitosis ==
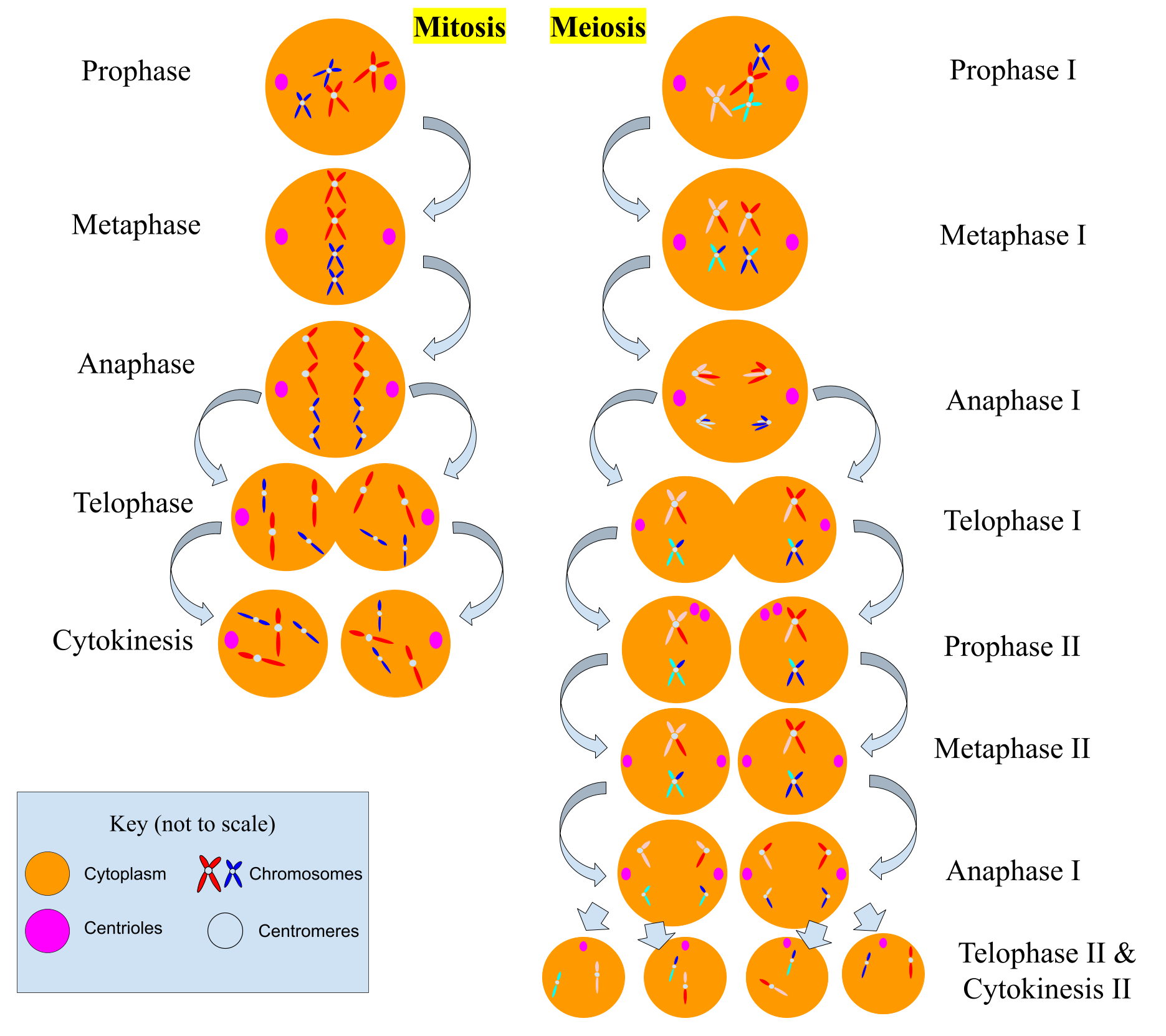
The two primary processes in cell division are mitosis and meiosis, which differ significantly despite sounding similar.

In order to understand meiosis, a comparison to mitosis is helpful. The table below shows the differences between meiosis and mitosis.

	Meiosis	Mitosis
End result	Normally four cells, each with half the number of chromosomes as the parent	Two cells, having the same number of chromosomes as the parent
Function	Production of gametes (sex cells) in sexually reproducing eukaryotes with diplont life cycle	Cellular reproduction, growth, repair, asexual reproduction
Where does it happen?	Almost all eukaryotes (animals, plants, fungi, and protists); In gonads, before gametes (in diplontic life cycles); After zygotes (in haplontic); Before spores (in haplodiplontic)	All proliferating cells in all eukaryotes
Steps	Prophase I, Metaphase I, Anaphase I, Telophase I, Prophase II, Metaphase II, Anaphase II, Telophase II	Prophase, Prometaphase, Metaphase, Anaphase, Telophase
Genetically same as parent?	No	Yes
Crossing over happens?	Yes, normally occurs between each pair of homologous chromosomes	Very rarely
Pairing of homologous chromosomes?	Yes	No
Cytokinesis	Occurs in Telophase I and Telophase II	Occurs in Telophase
Centromeres split	Does not occur in Anaphase I, but occurs in Anaphase II	Occurs in Anaphase

== Molecular regulation ==
Maturation promoting factor (MPF) seems to have a role in meiosis based on experiments with Xenopus laevis oocytes. Mammalian oocyte MPF induced germinal vesicle breakdown (GVB) in starfish and Xenopus laevis oocytes. MPF is active prior to GVB but falls off toward the end of meiosis I. CDK1 and cyclin B levels are correlated with oocyte GVB competence and are likely under translational rather than transcriptional control. In meiosis II, MPF reappears ahead of metaphase II, and its activity remains high up to fertilization.

In mammals, meiotic arrest begins with natriuretic peptide type C (NPPC) from mural granulosa cells, which activates production of cyclic guanosine 3′,5′-monophosphate (cGMP) in concert with natriuretic peptide receptor 2 (NPR2) on cumulus cells. cGMP diffuses into oocytes and halts meiosis by inhibiting phosphodiesterase 3A (PDE3A) and cyclic adenosine 3′,5′-monophosphate (cAMP) hydrolysis. In the oocyte, G-protein-coupled receptor GPR3/12 activates adenylyl cyclase to generate cAMP. cAMP stimulates protein kinase A (PKA) to activate the nuclear kinase WEE2 by phosphorylation. PKA also assists in phosphorylation of the CDK1 phosphatase CDC25B to keep it in the cytoplasm; in its unphosphorylated form, CDC25B migrates to the nucleus. Protein kinase C (PKC) may also have a role in inhibiting meiotic progression to metaphase II. Overall, CDK1 activity is suppressed to prevent resumption of meiosis. Oocytes further promote expression of NPR2 and inosine monophosphate dehydrogenase (and thereby the production of cGMP) in cumulus cells. Follicle-stimulating hormone and estradiol likewise promote expression of NPPC and NPR2. Hypoxanthine, a purine apparently originating in the follicle, also inhibits in vitro oocyte meiosis. A spike in luteinizing hormone (LH) spurs oocyte maturation, in which oocytes are released from meiotic arrest and progress from prophase I through metaphase II. LH-induced epidermal growth factor-like factors like amphiregulin and epiregulin synthesized in mural granulosa cells reduce levels of cGMP in oocytes by restricting cGMP transport through cumulus cell-oocyte gap junctions and lowering NPPC levels and NPR2 activity. In fact, LH-induced epidermal growth factor-like factors may cause the destabilization and breakdown of gap junctions altogether. LH-induced epidermal growth factor-like factors may trigger production of additional oocyte maturation factors like steroids and follicular fluid-derived meiosis-activating sterol (FF-MAS) in cumulus cells. FF-MAS promotes progression from metaphase I to metaphase II, and it may help stabilize metaphase II arrest. Meiosis resumption is reinforced by the exit of WEE2 from the nucleus due to CDK1 activation. Phosphodiesterases (PDEs) metabolize cAMP and may be temporarily activated by PKA-mediated phosphorylation.

Longer-term regulation of phosphodiesterases may require modulation of protein expression. For example, hypoxanthine is a PDE inhibitor that may stymie cAMP metabolism. Kinases like protein kinase B, Aurora kinase A, and polo-like kinase 1 contribute to the resumption of meiosis. There are similarities between the mechanisms of meiotic prophase I arrest and resumption and the mitotic G2 DNA damage checkpoint: CDC14B-based activation of APC-CDH1 in arrest and CDC25B-based resumption. Meiotic arrest requires inhibitory phosphorylation of CDK1 at amino acid residues Thr-14 and Tyr-15 by MYT1 and WEE1 as well as regulation of cyclin B levels facilitated by the anaphase-promoting complex (APC). CDK1 is regulated by cyclin B, whose synthesis peaks at the end of meiosis I. At anaphase I, cyclin B is degraded by an ubiquitin-dependent pathway. Cyclin B synthesis and CDK1 activation prompt oocytes to enter metaphase, while entry into anaphase follows ubiquitin-mediated cyclin B degradation, which brings down CDK1 activity. Proteolysis of adhesion proteins between homologous chromosomes is involved in anaphase I, while proteolysis of adhesion proteins between sister chromatids is involved in anaphase II. Meiosis II arrest is effected by cytostatic factor (CSF), whose elements include the MOS protein, mitogen-activated protein kinase kinase (MAPKK/MEK1), and MAPK. The protein kinase p90 (RSK) is one critical target of MAPK and may help block entry into S-phase between meiosis I and II by reactivating CDK1. There's evidence that RSK aids entry into meiosis I by inhibiting MYT1, which activates CDK1. CSF arrest might take place through regulation of the APC as part of the spindle assembly checkpoint.

In the budding yeast S. cerevisiae, Clb1 is the main meiotic regulatory cyclin, though Clb3 and Clb4 are also expressed during meiosis and activate a p34^{cdc28}-associated kinase immediately prior to the first meiotic division. The IME1 transcription factor drives entry into meiotic S-phase and is regulated according to inputs like nutrition. a1/α2 represses a repressor of IME1, initiating meiosis. Numerous S. cerevisiae meiotic regulatory genes have been identified. A few are presented here. IME1 enables sporulation of non-a/α diploids. IME2/SME1 enables sporulation when nitrogen is present, supports recombination in a/α cells expressing RME1, an inhibitor of meiosis, and encodes a protein kinase homolog. MCK1 (meiosis and centromere regulatory kinase) also supports recombination in a/α cells expressing RME1 and encodes a protein kinase homolog. SME2 enables sporulation when ammonia or glucose are present. UME1–5 enable expression of certain early meiotic genes in vegetative, non-a/α cells.

In the fission yeast S. pombe, the Cdc2 kinase and Cig2 cyclin together initiate the premeiotic S phase, while cyclin Cdc13 and the CDK activator Cdc25 are necessary for both meiotic divisions. However, the Pat1-Mei2 system is at the heart of S. pombe meiotic regulation. Mei2 is the major meiotic regulator. It moves between the nucleus and cytoplasm and works with meiRNA to promote meiosis I. Moreover, Mei2 is implicated in exit from mitosis and induction of premeiotic S phase. Mei2 may inactivate the DSR-Mmi1 system through sequestration of Mmi1 to stabilize meiosis-specific transcript expression. Mei2 may stall growth and bring about G1 arrest. Pat1 is a Ser/Thr protein kinase that phosphorylates Mei2, an RNA-binding protein, on residues Ser438 and Thr527. This phosphorylation may decrease the half-life of Mei2 by making it more likely to be destroyed by a proteasome working with E2 Ubc2 and E3 Ubr1. The Mei4 transcription factor is necessary to transcriptionally activate cdc25 in meiosis, and the mei4 mutant experiences cell cycle arrest. Mes1 inhibits the APC/C activator Slp1 such that the Cdc2-Cdc13 MPF activity can drive the second meiotic division.

It has been suggested that Yeast CEP1 gene product, that binds centromeric region CDE1, may play a role in chromosome pairing during meiosis-I.

Meiotic recombination is mediated through double stranded break, which is catalyzed by Spo11 protein. Also Mre11, Sae2 and Exo1 play role in breakage and recombination. After the breakage happen, recombination take place which is typically homologous. The recombination may go through either a double Holliday junction (dHJ) pathway or synthesis-dependent strand annealing (SDSA). (The second one gives to noncrossover product).

Seemingly there are checkpoints for meiotic cell division too. In S. pombe, Rad proteins, S. pombe Mek1 (with FHA kinase domain), Cdc25, Cdc2 and unknown factor is thought to form a checkpoint.

In vertebrate oogenesis, maintained by cytostatic factor (CSF) has role in switching into meiosis-II.

== See also ==
- Alternation of generations
- Apomixis
- Biological life cycle
- Brachymeiosis
- Coefficient of coincidence
- DNA repair
- Dikaryon
- Fertilisation
- Mating of yeast
- Mitotic recombination
- Oxidative stress
- Parthenogenesis
- Synizesis (biology)
