= Chromatid =

One half of a duplicated chromosome

In the diagram, (1) refers to a chromatid: 1-half of two identical threadlike strands of a replicated chromosome. During cell division, the identical copies (called a "sister chromatid pair") are joined at the region called the centromere (2). Once the paired sister chromatids have separated from one another (in the anaphase of mitosis) each is known as a daughter chromosome. The short arm of the right chromatid (3), and the long arm of the right chromatid (4), are also marked.

Schematic karyogram of the human chromosomes, showing their usual state in the G_{0} and G_{1} phase of the cell cycle. At top center it also shows the chromosome 3 pair in metaphase (annotated as "Meta."), which takes place after having undergone DNA synthesis which occurs in the S phase (annotated as S) of the cell cycle. During metaphase, each chromosome is duplicated into sister chromatids.

A chromatid (Greek khrōmat- 'color' + -id) is one half of a duplicated chromosome. Before replication, one chromosome is composed of one DNA molecule. In replication, the DNA molecule is copied, and the two molecules are known as chromatids. During the later stages of cell division these chromatids separate longitudinally to become individual chromosomes.

Chromatid pairs are normally genetically identical, and said to be homozygous. However, if mutations occur, they will present slight differences, in which case they are heterozygous. The pairing of chromatids should not be confused with the ploidy of an organism, which is the number of homologous versions of a chromosome.

== Sister chromatids ==
Condensation and resolution of human sister chromatids in early mitosis

Chromatids may be sister or non-sister chromatids. A sister chromatid is either one of the two chromatids of the same chromosome joined together by a common centromere. A pair of sister chromatids is called a dyad. Once sister chromatids have separated (during the anaphase of mitosis or the anaphase II of meiosis during sexual reproduction), they are again called chromosomes, each having the same genetic mass as one of the individual chromatids that made up its parent. The DNA sequence of two sister chromatids is completely identical (apart from very rare DNA copying errors).

Sister chromatid exchange (SCE) is the exchange of genetic information between two sister chromatids. SCEs can occur during mitosis or meiosis. SCEs appear to primarily reflect DNA recombinational repair processes responding to DNA damage (see article Sister chromatid exchange).

Non-sister chromatids, on the other hand, refers to either of the two chromatids of paired homologous chromosomes, that is, the pairing of a paternal chromosome and a maternal chromosome. In chromosomal crossovers, non-sister (homologous) chromatids form chiasmata to exchange genetic material during the prophase I of meiosis (See Homologous chromosome pair).

== See also ==
- Kinetochore
