= HORMA domain =

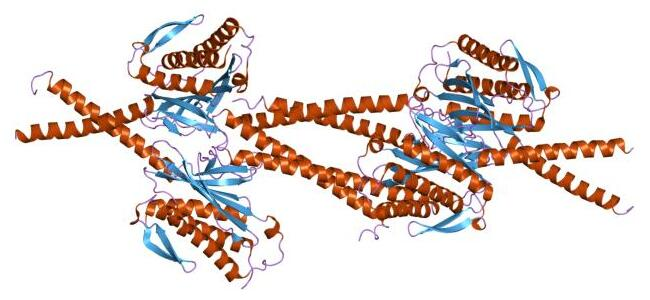
- crystal structure of mad1-mad2 reveals a conserved mad2 binding motif in mad1 and cdc20.

Identifiers
- Symbol: HORMA
- Pfam: PF02301
- InterPro: IPR003511
- SCOP2: 1duj / SCOPe / SUPFAM
Available protein structures:
- Pfam: structures / ECOD
- PDB: RCSB PDB; PDBe; PDBj
- PDBsum: structure summary

In molecular biology, the HORMA domain (named after the Hop1p, Rev7p and MAD2 proteins) is a protein domain that has been suggested to recognise chromatin states resulting from DNA adducts, double stranded breaks or non-attachment to the spindle and act as an adaptor that recruits other proteins. Hop1 is a meiosis-specific protein, Rev7 is required for DNA damage induced mutagenesis, and MAD2 is a spindle checkpoint protein which prevents progression of the cell cycle upon detection of a defect in mitotic spindle integrity.

== Examples ==
Humans proteins containing this domain include:

- HORMAD1, HORMAD2, MAD2L1, MAD2L2
