= ARID4B =

Protein

Identifiers
- Aliases: ARID4B, BCAA, BRCAA1, RBBP1L1, RBP1L1, SAP180, AT-rich interaction domain 4B
- External IDs: OMIM: 609696; MGI: 2137512; GeneCards: ARID4B

Gene location (Human)
Chr.	Chromosome 1 (human)
Band	1q42.3	Start	235,131,634 bp
Band	1q42.3	End	235,328,219 bp

Gene location (Mouse)
Chr.	Chromosome 13 (mouse)
Band	13 A1|13 5.29 cM	Start	14,237,817 bp
Band	13 A1|13 5.29 cM	End	14,374,188 bp
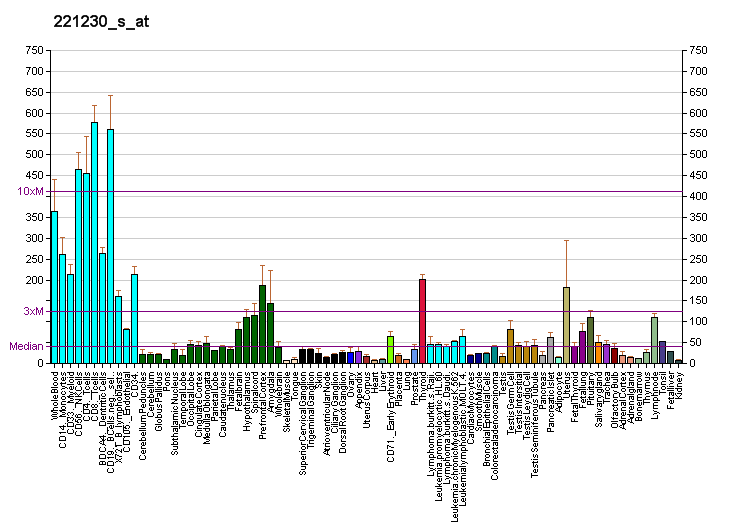
RNA expression pattern
Bgee	Human / Mouse (ortholog); Top expressed in: Epithelium of choroid plexus; sperm; parietal pleura; visceral pleura; epithelium of nasopharynx; tibia; Achilles tendon; germinal epithelium; sural nerve; buccal mucosa cell / Top expressed in: tail of embryo; ascending aorta; aortic valve; medullary collecting duct; supraoptic nucleus; genital tubercle; cumulus cell; trigeminal ganglion; ganglionic eminence; blood; More reference expression data
BioGPS	More reference expression data
Gene ontology
Molecular function	DNA binding; protein binding; histone deacetylase activity; molecular function; DNA-binding transcription factor activity, RNA polymerase II-specific
Cellular component	cytoplasm; nucleoplasm; nucleus; cellular component
Biological process	regulation of gene expression by genetic imprinting; regulation of transcription, DNA-templated; establishment of Sertoli cell barrier; regulation of transcription by RNA polymerase II; histone H4-K20 trimethylation; transcription, DNA-templated; histone H3-K9 trimethylation; spermatogenesis; positive regulation of transcription by RNA polymerase II; histone deacetylation; biological process; chromatin organization
Sources:Amigo / QuickGO
Orthologs
Databases	NCBI: entry; OMA: entry
Species	Human	Mouse
Entrez	51742	94246
Ensembl	ENSG00000054267	ENSMUSG00000039219
UniProt	Q4LE39	A2CG63
RefSeq (mRNA)	NM_001206794; NM_016374; NM_031371	NM_194262; NM_198122
RefSeq (protein)	NP_001193723; NP_057458; NP_112739	NP_919238; NP_937755
Location (UCSC)	Chr 1: 235.13 – 235.33 Mb	Chr 13: 14.24 – 14.37 Mb
PubMed search
- Wikidata
View/Edit Human	View/Edit Mouse

AT-rich interactive domain-containing protein 4B is a protein that in humans is encoded by the ARID4B gene.

== Function ==
This gene encodes a protein with sequence similarity to retinoblastoma-binding protein-1. The encoded protein is a subunit of the histone deacetylase-dependent SIN3A transcriptional corepressor complex, which functions in diverse cellular processes including proliferation, differentiation, apoptosis, oncogenesis, and cell fate determination. The gene product is recognized by IgG antibody isolated from a breast cancer patient and appears to be a molecular marker associated with a broad range of human malignancies. Alternate transcriptional splice variants encoding different isoforms have been characterized.
