= Cell growth =

Increase of the total mass of a cell

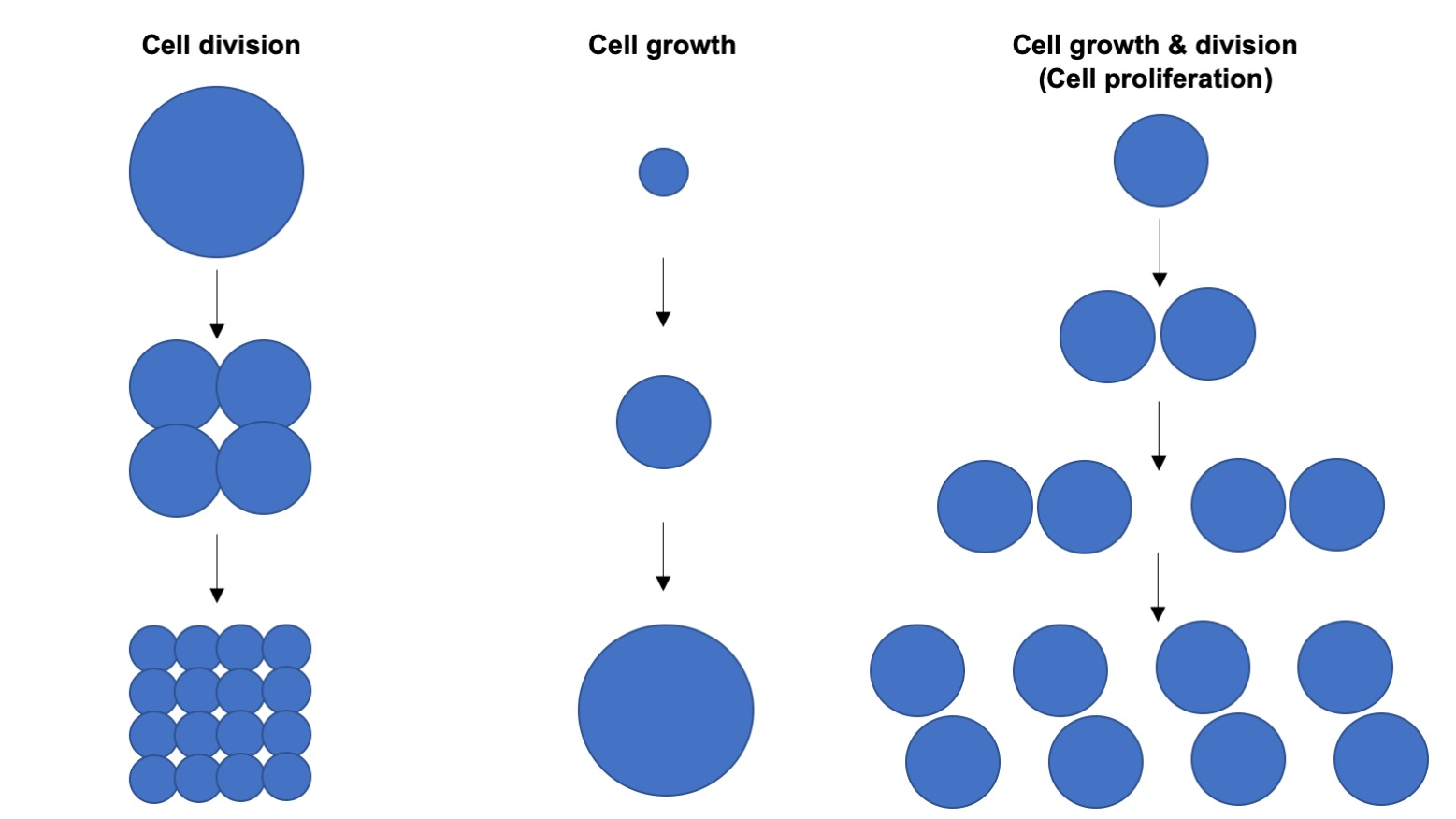
Cell division, growth & proliferation

Cell growth refers to an increase in the total mass of a cell, including both cytoplasmic, nuclear and organelle volume. Cell growth occurs when the overall rate of cellular biosynthesis (production of biomolecules or anabolism) is greater than the overall rate of cellular degradation (the destruction of biomolecules via the proteasome, lysosome or autophagy, or catabolism).

Cell growth is not to be confused with cell division or the cell cycle, which are distinct processes that can occur alongside cell growth during the process of cell proliferation, where a cell, known as the mother cell, grows and divides to produce two daughter cells. Importantly, cell growth and cell division can also occur independently of one another. During early embryonic development (cleavage of the zygote to form a morula and blastoderm), cell divisions occur repeatedly without cell growth. Conversely, some cells can grow without cell division or without any progression of the cell cycle, such as growth of neurons during axonal pathfinding in nervous system development.

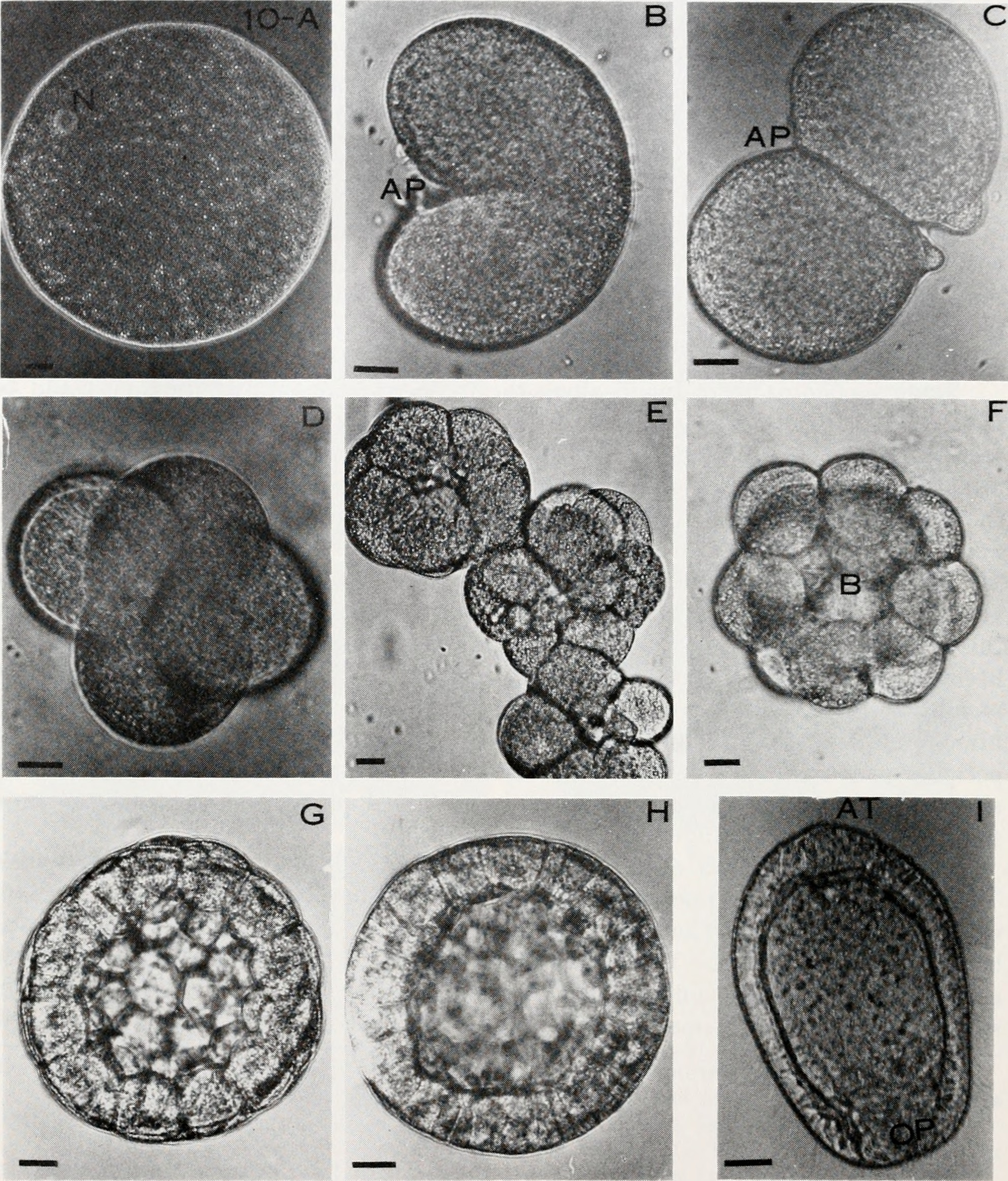
Cell division without cell growth during embryonic cleavage

In multicellular organisms, tissue growth rarely occurs solely through cell growth without cell division, but most often occurs through cell proliferation. This is because a single cell with only one copy of the genome in the cell nucleus can perform biosynthesis and thus undergo cell growth at only half the rate of two cells. Hence, two cells grow (accumulate mass) at twice the rate of a single cell, and four cells grow at 4-times the rate of a single cell. This principle leads to an exponential increase of tissue growth rate (mass accumulation) during cell proliferation, owing to the exponential increase in cell number.

Cell size depends on both cell growth and cell division, with a disproportionate increase in the rate of cell growth leading to production of larger cells and a disproportionate increase in the rate of cell division leading to production of many smaller cells. Cell proliferation typically involves balanced cell growth and cell division rates that maintain a roughly constant cell size in the exponentially proliferating population of cells.

Some special cells can grow to very large sizes via an unusual endoreplication cell cycle in which the genome is replicated during S-phase but there is no subsequent mitosis (M-phase) or cell division (cytokinesis). These large endoreplicating cells have many copies of the genome, so are highly polyploid.

Oocytes can be unusually large cells in species for which embryonic development takes place away from the mother's body within an egg that is laid externally. The large size of some eggs can be achieved either by pumping in cytosolic components from adjacent cells through cytoplasmic bridges named ring canals (Drosophila) or by internalisation of nutrient storage granules (yolk granules) by endocytosis (frogs).

== Mechanisms of cell growth control ==
Cells can grow by increasing the overall rate of cellular biosynthesis such that production of biomolecules exceeds the overall rate of cellular degradation of biomolecules via the proteasome, lysosome or autophagy.

Biosynthesis of biomolecules is initiated by expression of genes which encode RNAs and/or proteins, including enzymes that catalyse synthesis of lipids and carbohydrates.

Individual genes are generally expressed via transcription into messenger RNA (mRNA) and translation into proteins, and the expression of each gene occurs to various different levels in a cell-type specific fashion (in response to gene regulatory networks).

To drive cell growth, the global rate of gene expression can be increased by enhancing the overall rate of transcription by RNA polymerase II (for active genes) or the overall rate of mRNA translation into protein by increasing the abundance of ribosomes and tRNA, whose biogenesis depends on RNA polymerase I and RNA polymerase III. The Myc transcription factor is an example of a regulatory protein that can induce the overall activity of RNA polymerase I, RNA polymerase II and RNA polymerase III to drive global transcription and translation and thereby cell growth.

In addition, the activity of individual ribosomes can be increased to boost the global efficiency of mRNA translation via regulation of translation initiation factors, including the 'translational elongation initiation factor 4E' (eIF4E) complex, which binds to and caps the 5' end of mRNAs. The protein TOR, part of the TORC1 complex, is an important upstream regulator of translation initiation as well as ribosome biogenesis. TOR is a serine/threonine kinase that can directly phosphorylate and inactivate a general inhibitor of eIF4E, named 4E-binding protein (4E-BP), to promote translation efficiency. TOR also directly phosphorylates and activates the ribosomal protein S6-kinase (S6K), which promotes ribosome biogenesis.

To inhibit cell growth, the global rate of gene expression can be decreased or the global rate of biomolecular degradation can be increased by increasing the rate of autophagy. TOR normally directly inhibits the function of the autophagy inducing kinase Atg1/ULK1. Thus, reducing TOR activity both reduces the global rate of translation and increases the extent of autophagy to reduce cell growth.

== Cell growth regulation in animals ==
Many of the signal molecules that control of cellular growth are called growth factors, many of which induce signal transduction via the PI3K/AKT/mTOR pathway, which includes upstream lipid kinase PI3K and the downstream serine/threonine protein kinase Akt, which is able to activate another protein kinase TOR, which promotes translation and inhibits autophagy to drive cell growth.

Nutrient availability influences production of growth factors of the Insulin/IGF-1 family, which circulate as hormones in animals to activate the PI3K/AKT/mTOR pathway in cells to promote TOR activity so that when animals are well fed they will grow rapidly and when they are not able to receive sufficient nutrients they will reduce their growth rate. Recently it has been also demonstrated that cellular bicarbonate metabolism, which is responsible for cell growth, can be regulated by mTORC1 signaling.

In addition, the availability of amino acids to individual cells also directly promotes TOR activity, although this mode of regulation is more important in single-celled organisms than in multicellular organisms such as animals that always maintain an abundance of amino acids in circulation.

One disputed theory proposes that many different mammalian cells undergo size-dependent transitions during the cell cycle. These transitions are controlled by the cyclin-dependent kinase Cdk1. Though the proteins that control Cdk1 are well understood, their connection to mechanisms monitoring cell size remains elusive.

A postulated model for mammalian size control situates mass as the driving force of the cell cycle. A cell is unable to grow to an abnormally large size because at a certain cell size or cell mass, the S phase is initiated. The S phase starts the sequence of events leading to mitosis and cytokinesis. A cell is unable to get too small because the later cell cycle events, such as S, G2, and M, are delayed until mass increases sufficiently to begin S phase.

== Cell populations ==
Cell populations go through a particular type of exponential growth called doubling or cell proliferation. Thus, each generation of cells should be twice as numerous as the previous generation. However, the number of generations only gives a maximum figure as not all cells survive in each generation. Cells can reproduce in the stage of Mitosis, where they double and split into two genetically equal cells.

== Cell size ==
Cell size is highly variable among organisms, with some algae such as Caulerpa taxifolia being a single cell several meters in length. Plant cells are much larger than animal cells, and protists such as Paramecium can be 330 μm long, while a typical human cell might be 10 μm. How these cells "decide" how big they should be before dividing is an open question. Chemical gradients are known to be partly responsible, and it is hypothesized that mechanical stress detection by cytoskeletal structures is involved. Work on the topic generally requires an organism whose cell cycle is well-characterized.

Unsolved problem in biology
How do cells determine what size to grow to before dividing?
More unsolved problems in biology

=== Yeast cell size regulation ===
The relationship between cell size and cell division has been extensively studied in yeast. For some cells, there is a mechanism by which cell division is not initiated until a cell has reached a certain size. If the nutrient supply is restricted (after time t = 2 in the diagram, below), and the rate of increase in cell size is slowed, the time period between cell divisions is increased. Yeast cell-size mutants were isolated that begin cell division before reaching a normal/regular size (wee mutants).

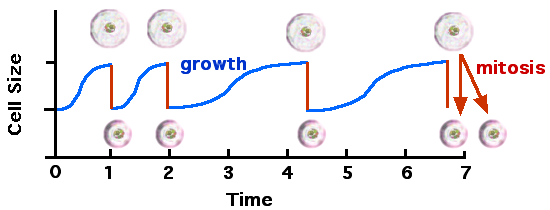
Figure 1:Cell cycle and growth

Wee1 protein is a tyrosine kinase that normally phosphorylates the Cdc2 cell cycle regulatory protein (the homolog of CDK1 in humans), a cyclin-dependent kinase, on a tyrosine residue. Cdc2 drives entry into mitosis by phosphorylating a wide range of targets. This covalent modification of the molecular structure of Cdc2 inhibits the enzymatic activity of Cdc2 and prevents cell division. Wee1 acts to keep Cdc2 inactive during early G2 when cells are still small. When cells have reached sufficient size during G2, the phosphatase Cdc25 removes the inhibitory phosphorylation, and thus activates Cdc2 to allow mitotic entry. A balance of Wee1 and Cdc25 activity with changes in cell size is coordinated by the mitotic entry control system. It has been shown in Wee1 mutants, cells with weakened Wee1 activity, that Cdc2 becomes active when the cell is smaller. Thus, mitosis occurs before the yeast reach their normal size. This suggests that cell division may be regulated in part by dilution of Wee1 protein in cells as they grow larger.

==== Linking Cdr2 to Wee1 ====
The protein kinase Cdr2 (which negatively regulates Wee1) and the Cdr2-related kinase Cdr1 (which directly phosphorylates and inhibits Wee1 in vitro) are localized to a band of cortical nodes in the middle of interphase cells. After entry into mitosis, cytokinesis factors such as myosin II are recruited to similar nodes; these nodes eventually condense to form the cytokinetic ring. A previously uncharacterized protein, Blt1, was found to colocalize with Cdr2 in the medial interphase nodes. Blt1 knockout cells had increased length at division, which is consistent with a delay in mitotic entry. This finding connects a physical location, a band of cortical nodes, with factors that have been shown to directly regulate mitotic entry, namely Cdr1, Cdr2, and Blt1.

Further experimentation with GFP-tagged proteins and mutant proteins indicates that the medial cortical nodes are formed by the ordered, Cdr2-dependent assembly of multiple interacting proteins during interphase. Cdr2 is at the top of this hierarchy and works upstream of Cdr1 and Blt1. Mitosis is promoted by the negative regulation of Wee1 by Cdr2. It has also been shown that Cdr2 recruits Wee1 to the medial cortical node. The mechanism of this recruitment has yet to be discovered. A Cdr2 kinase mutant, which is able to localize properly despite a loss of function in phosphorylation, disrupts the recruitment of Wee1 to the medial cortex and delays entry into mitosis. Thus, Wee1 localizes with its inhibitory network, which demonstrates that mitosis is controlled through Cdr2-dependent negative regulation of Wee1 at the medial cortical nodes.

==== Cell polarity factors ====
Cell polarity factors positioned at the cell tips provide spatial cues to limit Cdr2 distribution to the cell middle. In fission yeast Schizosaccharomyces pombe (S. Pombe), cells divide at a defined, reproducible size during mitosis because of the regulated activity of Cdk1. The cell polarity protein kinase Pom1, a member of the dual-specificity tyrosine-phosphorylation regulated kinase (DYRK) family of kinases, localizes to cell ends. In Pom1 knockout cells, Cdr2 was no longer restricted to the cell middle, but was seen diffusely through half of the cell. From this data it becomes apparent that Pom1 provides inhibitory signals that confine Cdr2 to the middle of the cell. It has been further shown that Pom1-dependent signals lead to the phosphorylation of Cdr2. Pom1 knockout cells were also shown to divide at a smaller size than wild-type, which indicates a premature entry into mitosis.

Pom1 forms polar gradients that peak at cell ends, which shows a direct link between size control factors and a specific physical location in the cell. As a cell grows in size, a gradient in Pom1 grows. When cells are small, Pom1 is spread diffusely throughout the cell body. As the cell increases in size, Pom1 concentration decreases in the middle and becomes concentrated at cell ends. Small cells in early G2 which contain sufficient levels of Pom1 in the entirety of the cell have inactive Cdr2 and cannot enter mitosis. It is not until the cells grow into late G2, when Pom1 is confined to the cell ends that Cdr2 in the medial cortical nodes is activated and able to start the inhibition of Wee1. This finding shows how cell size plays a direct role in regulating the start of mitosis. In this model, Pom1 acts as a molecular link between cell growth and mitotic entry through a Cdr2-Cdr1-Wee1-Cdk1 pathway. The Pom1 polar gradient successfully relays information about cell size and geometry to the Cdk1 regulatory system. Through this gradient, the cell ensures it has reached a defined, sufficient size to enter mitosis.

=== Other experimental systems for the study of cell size regulation ===
One common means to produce very large cells is by cell fusion to form syncytia. For example, very long (several inches) skeletal muscle cells are formed by fusion of thousands of myocytes. Genetic studies of the fruit fly Drosophila have revealed several genes that are required for the formation of multinucleated muscle cells by fusion of myoblasts. Some of the key proteins are important for cell adhesion between myocytes and some are involved in adhesion-dependent cell-to-cell signal transduction that allows for a cascade of cell fusion events.

Increases in the size of plant cells are complicated by the fact that almost all plant cells are inside of a solid cell wall. Under the influence of certain plant hormones the cell wall can be remodeled, allowing for increases in cell size that are important for the growth of some plant tissues.

Most unicellular organisms are microscopic in size, but there are some giant bacteria and protozoa that are visible to the naked eye. (See Table of cell sizes—Dense populations of a giant sulfur bacterium in Namibian shelf sediments—Large protists of the genus Chaos, closely related to the genus Amoeba.)

In the rod-shaped bacteria E. coli, Caulobacter crescentus and B. subtilis cell size is controlled by a simple mechanisms in which cell division occurs after a constant volume has been added since the previous division. By always growing by the same amount, cells born smaller or larger than average naturally converge to an average size equivalent to the amount added during each generation.

== Cell division ==
Cell reproduction is asexual. For most of the constituents of the cell, growth is a steady, continuous process, interrupted only briefly at M phase when the nucleus and then the cell divide in two.

The process of cell division, called cell cycle, has four major parts called phases. The first part, called G_{1} phase is marked by synthesis of various enzymes that are required for DNA replication. The second part of the cell cycle is the S phase, where DNA replication produces two identical sets of chromosomes. The third part is the G_{2} phase in which a significant protein synthesis occurs, mainly involving the production of microtubules that are required during the process of division, called mitosis. The fourth phase, M phase, consists of nuclear division (karyokinesis) and cytoplasmic division (cytokinesis), accompanied by the formation of a new cell membrane. This is the physical division of mother and daughter cells. The M phase has been broken down into several distinct phases, sequentially known as prophase, prometaphase, metaphase, anaphase and telophase leading to cytokinesis.

Cell division is more complex in eukaryotes than in other organisms. Prokaryotic cells such as bacterial cells reproduce by binary fission, a process that includes DNA replication, chromosome segregation, and cytokinesis. Eukaryotic cell division either involves mitosis or a more complex process called meiosis. Mitosis and meiosis are sometimes called the two nuclear division processes. Binary fission is similar to eukaryote cell reproduction that involves mitosis. Both lead to the production of two daughter cells with the same number of chromosomes as the parental cell. Meiosis is used for a special cell reproduction process of diploid organisms. It produces four special daughter cells (gametes) which have half the normal cellular amount of DNA. A male and a female gamete can then combine to produce a zygote, a cell which again has the normal amount of chromosomes.

The rest of this article is a comparison of the main features of the three types of cell reproduction that either involve binary fission, mitosis, or meiosis. The diagram below depicts the similarities and differences of these three types of cell reproduction.

Cell growth

=== Comparison of the three types of cell division ===
The DNA content of a cell is duplicated at the start of the cell reproduction process. Prior to DNA replication, the DNA content of a cell can be represented as the amount Z (the cell has Z chromosomes). After the DNA replication process, the amount of DNA in the cell is 2Z (multiplication: 2 x Z = 2Z). During Binary fission and mitosis the duplicated DNA content of the reproducing parental cell is separated into two equal halves that are destined to end up in the two daughter cells. The final part of the cell reproduction process is cell division, when daughter cells physically split apart from a parental cell. During meiosis, there are two cell division steps that together produce the four daughter cells.

After the completion of binary fission or cell reproduction involving mitosis, each daughter cell has the same amount of DNA (Z) as what the parental cell had before it replicated its DNA. These two types of cell reproduction produced two daughter cells that have the same number of chromosomes as the parental cell. Chromosomes duplicate prior to cell division when forming new skin cells for reproduction. After meiotic cell reproduction the four daughter cells have half the number of chromosomes that the parental cell originally had. This is the haploid amount of DNA, often symbolized as N. Meiosis is used by diploid organisms to produce haploid gametes. In a diploid organism such as the human organism, most cells of the body have the diploid amount of DNA, 2N. Using this notation for counting chromosomes we say that human somatic cells have 46 chromosomes (2N = 46) while human sperm and eggs have 23 chromosomes (N = 23). Humans have 23 distinct types of chromosomes, the 22 autosomes and the special category of sex chromosomes. There are two distinct sex chromosomes, the X chromosome and the Y chromosome. A diploid human cell has 23 chromosomes from that person's father and 23 from the mother. That is, your body has two copies of human chromosome number 2, one from each of your parents.

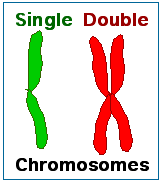
Chromosomes

Immediately after DNA replication a human cell will have 46 "double chromosomes". In each double chromosome there are two copies of that chromosome's DNA molecule. During mitosis the double chromosomes are split to produce 92 "single chromosomes", half of which go into each daughter cell. During meiosis, there are two chromosome separation steps which assure that each of the four daughter cells gets one copy of each of the 23 types of chromosome.

=== Sexual reproduction ===
Though cell reproduction that uses mitosis can reproduce eukaryotic cells, eukaryotes bother with the more complicated process of meiosis because sexual reproduction such as meiosis confers a selective advantage. Notice that when meiosis starts, the two copies of sister chromatids number 2 are adjacent to each other. During this time, there can be genetic recombination events. Information from the chromosome 2 DNA gained from one parent (red) will transfer over to the chromosome 2 DNA molecule that was received from the other parent (green). Notice that in mitosis the two copies of chromosome number 2 do not interact. Recombination of genetic information between homologous chromosomes during meiosis is a process for repairing DNA damages. This process can also produce new combinations of genes, some of which may be adaptively beneficial and influence the course of evolution. However, in organisms with more than one set of chromosomes at the main life cycle stage, sex may also provide an advantage because, under random mating, it produces homozygotes and heterozygotes according to the Hardy–Weinberg ratio.

== Disorders ==
A series of growth disorders can occur at the cellular level and these consequently underpin much of the subsequent course in cancer, in which a group of cells display uncontrolled growth and division beyond the normal limits, invasion (intrusion on and destruction of adjacent tissues), and sometimes metastasis (spread to other locations in the body via lymph or blood). Several key determinants of cell growth, like ploidy and the regulation of cellular metabolism, are commonly disrupted in tumors. Therefore, heterogenous cell growth and pleomorphism is one of the earliest hallmarks of cancer progression. Despite the prevalence of pleomorphism in human pathology, its role in disease progression is unclear. In epithelial tissues, misregulation of cellular size can induce packing defects and disperse aberrant cells. But the consequence of atypical cell growth in other animal tissues is unknown.

== Measurement methods ==
The cell growth can be detected by a variety of methods. The cell size growth can be visualized by microscopy, using suitable stains. But the increase of cells number is usually more significant. It can be measured by manual counting of cells under microscopy observation, using the dye exclusion method (i.e. trypan blue) to count only viable cells. Less fastidious, scalable, methods include the use of cytometers, while flow cytometry allows combining cell counts ('events') with other specific parameters: fluorescent probes for membranes, cytoplasm or nuclei allow distinguishing dead/viable cells, cell types, cell differentiation, expression of a biomarker such as Ki67. The total mass of a cell, which comprises the mass of all its components including its water content, is a dynamic magnitude and it can be measured in real-time and tracked over hours or even days using an inertial picobalance. A cell's buoyant mass, which corresponds to the total mass of the cell minus that of the fluid it displaces, can be measured using suspended microchannel resonators.

Beside the increasing number of cells, one can be assessed regarding the metabolic activity growth, that is, the CFDA and calcein-AM measure (fluorimetrically) not only the membrane functionality (dye retention), but also the functionality of cytoplasmic enzymes (esterases). The MTT assays (colorimetric) and the resazurin assay (fluorimetric) dose the mitochondrial redox potential.

All these assays may correlate well, or not, depending on cell growth conditions and desired aspects (activity, proliferation). The task is even more complicated with populations of different cells, furthermore when combining cell growth interferences or toxicity.

== See also ==
- Bacterial growth

== Books ==
- Morgan, David O. (2007). The cell cycle: principles of control. London: Sunderland, Mass. ISBN 978-0-9539181-2-6.
