= Telson =

Hindmost division of an arthropod body

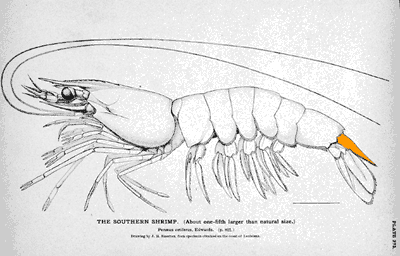
Diagram highlighting the telson of the prawn Litopenaeus setiferus

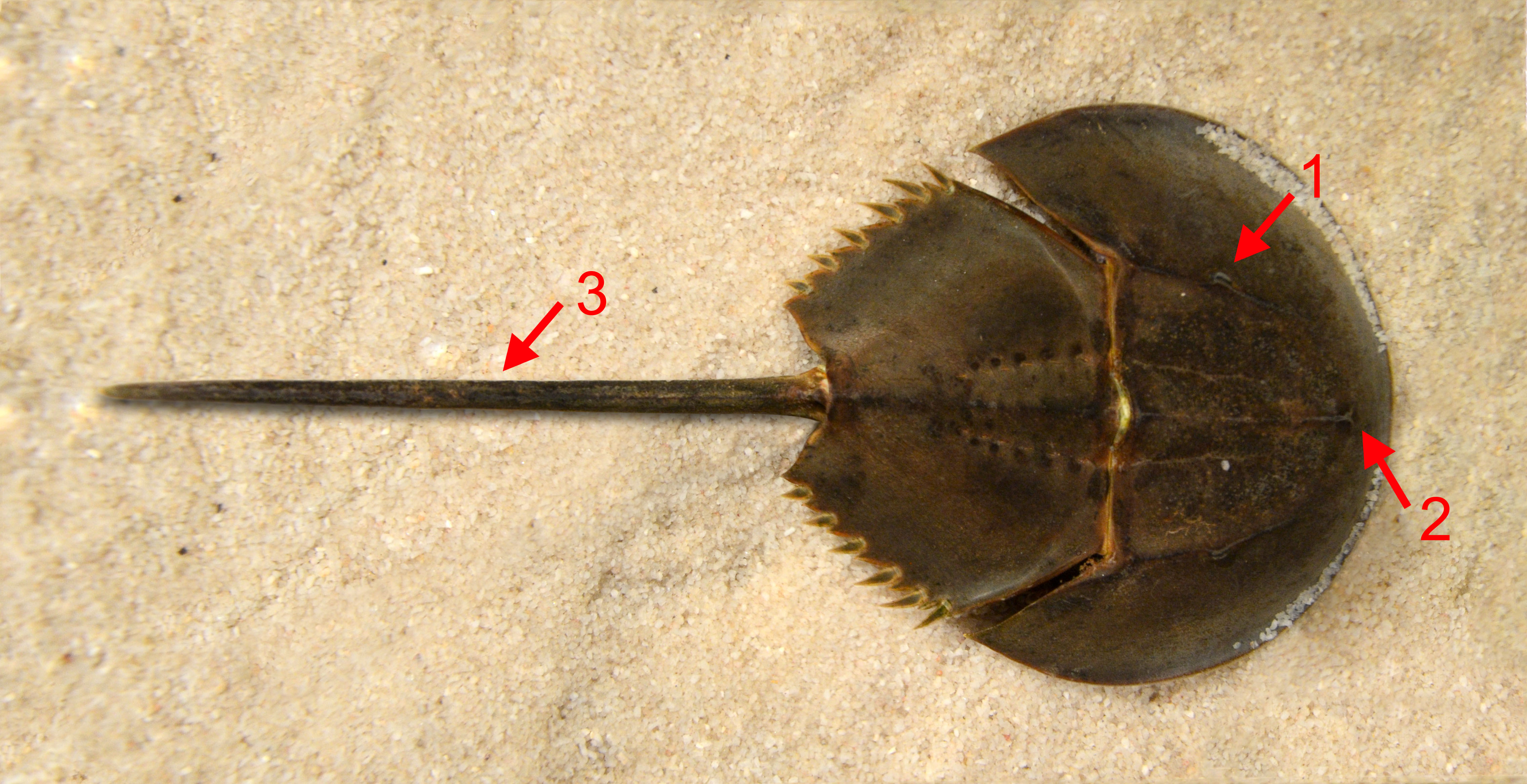
Telson (arrow no. 3) of the horseshoe crab Carcinoscorpius rotundicauda

The telson (from Ancient Greek τέλσον 'headlands, limit') is the hindmost division of the body of an arthropod. Depending on the definition, the telson is either considered to be the final segment of the arthropod body, or an additional division that is not a true segment on account of not arising in the embryo from teloblast areas as other segments. It never carries any appendages, but a forked "tail" called the caudal furca may be present. The shape and composition of the telson differs between arthropod groups.

== Crustaceans ==
In lobsters, shrimp and other decapods, the telson, along with the uropods, forms the tail fan. This is used as a paddle in the caridoid escape reaction ("lobstering"), whereby an alarmed animal rapidly flexes its tail, causing it to dart backwards. Krill can reach speeds of over 60 cm per second by this means. The trigger time to optical stimulus is, in spite of the low temperatures, only 55 milliseconds.

In the Isopoda and Tanaidacea (superorder Peracarida), the last abdominal body segment is fused with the telson, forming a "pleotelson".

== Chelicerates ==
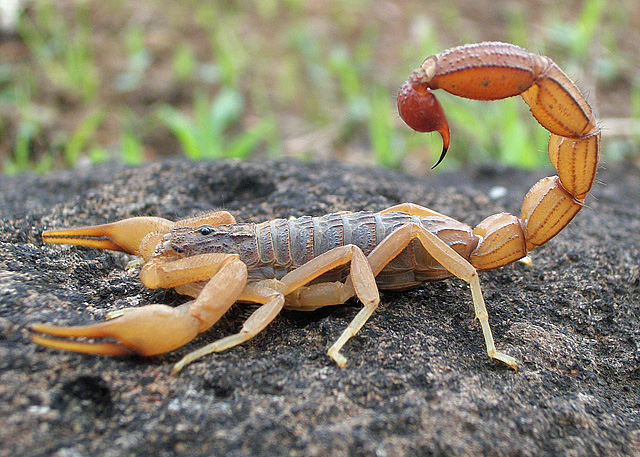
Hottentotta tamulus scorpion, showing telson

The term telson is widely used for the caudal spine of some chelicerates. The chelicerate telson can be clearly seen in a number of fossil species (like in eurypterids) and in extant animals (like the horseshoe crab "tail" and the scorpion sting). Some authorities have urged that the usage of this word in this context be discouraged.

== Myriapods ==
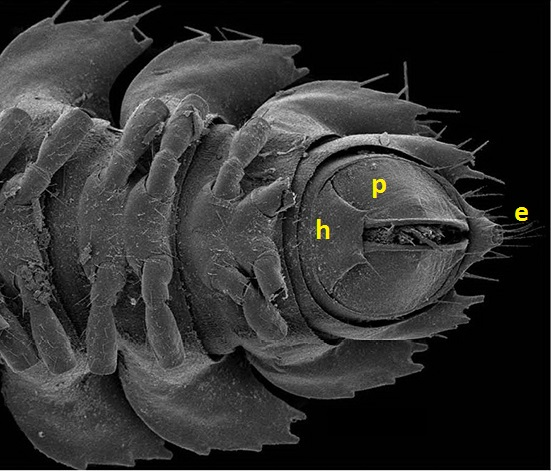
Telson of a millipede, including an epiproct (e), hypoproct (h) and paraprocts (p)

In millipedes, the telson consists of a legless pre-anal body segment (which may contain a posterior extension known as an epiproct), a pair of anal valves (paraprocts) or plates closing off the anus, and a plate below the anus (hypoproct), also known as a subanal scale.

In centipedes the telson is the hindmost body segment, posterior to the genital openings, bearing two anal valves.

== Hexapods ==
Proturans, an order of minute soil-dwelling animals, are the only hexapods with a telson.

== See also ==
- Opisthosoma
- Pygidium
