= CDR1 =

CDR1 can refer to

- Complementarity-determining region 1 on antibodies
- CDR1 (gene), cerebellar degeneration-related protein 1
