= Cell fate determination =

Process involved in cell fate commitment

Fate determination in developmental biology is the particular development of a specific cell type. In an embryo, several processes play out at a molecular level to create an organism. These processes include cell proliferation, differentiation, cellular movement and programmed cell death.

Each cell in an embryo receives molecular signals from neighboring cells in the form of proteins, RNAs and even surface interactions. Almost all animals undergo a similar sequence of events during very early development, a conserved process known as embryogenesis. During embryogenesis, cells exist in three germ layers, and undergo gastrulation. While embryogenesis has been studied for more than a century, it was only recently (the past 25 years or so) that scientists discovered that a basic set of the same proteins and mRNAs are involved in embryogenesis.

Evolutionary conservation is one of the reasons that model organisms such as the fruit fly (Drosophila melanogaster) or the house mouse (Mus musculus) are used to study embryogenesis and developmental biology. Studying model organisms provides information relevant to other animals, including humans. While studying different model systems, cell fate was discovered to be determined via multiple mechanisms, two of which include combinations of transcription factors and cell-cell interactions.

Fate determination mechanisms were categorized into three different types, autonomous specification, conditional specification, and syncytial specification. Research in cell fate determination was done primarily via two types of experiments, known as ablation and transplantation. The findings of these experiments contributed to uncovering the fate of studied cells.

== Cell fate ==
The development of new molecular tools, including GFP and major advances in imaging technology such as fluorescence microscopy, have made possible the mapping of the cell lineage of Caenorhabditis elegans from its embryo. Fate mapping is used to study cells as they differentiate and gain specified function. Merely observing a cell as it becomes differentiated during embryogenesis provides no indication of the mechanisms that drive the specification. However, the use of molecular techniques, including gene and protein knock downs, knock outs and overexpression allows investigation into the mechanisms of fate determination. Improvements in imaging tools including live confocal microscopy and super resolution microscopy allow visualization of molecular changes in experimentally manipulated cells as compared to controls. Transplantation experiments can also be used in conjunction with the genetic manipulation and lineage tracing. Newer cell fate determination techniques include lineage tracing performed using inducible Cre-lox transgenic mice, where specific cell populations can be experimentally mapped using reporters like brainbow, a colorful reporter that is useful in the brain and other tissues to follow the differentiation path of a cell.

During embryogenesis, for a number of cell cleavages (the specific number depends on the type of organism) all the cells of an embryo will be morphologically and developmentally equivalent. This means, each cell has the same development potential and all cells are essentially interchangeable, thus establishing an equivalence group. The developmental equivalence of these cells is usually established via transplantation or ablation experiments. As embryos mature, more complex fate determination occurs as cells differentiate, beginning to perform more specific functions. Generally, once cells have a specified fate and have undergone cellular differentiation, they cannot return to less specified states; however, emerging research indicates that de-differentiation is possible under certain conditions including wound healing and cancer.

The determination of a cell to a particular fate can be broken down into two states where the cell can be specified (committed) or determined. In the state of being committed or specified, the cell type is not yet determined and any bias the cell has toward a certain fate can be reversed or transformed to another fate. If a cell is in a determined state, the cell's fate cannot be reversed or transformed. In general, this means that a cell "determined" to be a brain cell cannot "differentiate" into a skin cell. Determination is followed by differentiation, which involves the actual changes in biochemistry, structure, and function that result in specific cell types. Differentiation often involves a change in appearance as well as function.

== Modes of specification ==
There are three general ways a cell can become specified for a particular fate: autonomous, conditional, or syncytial specification.

=== Autonomous specification ===
Autonomous specification is a mechanism in which embryonic cells develop according to intrinsic, inherited instructions rather than external signals. This type of specification contributes to mosaic development, where individuals follow a genetically engineered program. The cell-intrinsic properties arise from a cleavage of a cell with asymmetrically expressed maternal cytoplasmic determinants (proteins, small regulatory RNAs and mRNA). Thus, the fate of the cell depends on factors secreted into its cytoplasm during cleavage. Autonomous specification was first demonstrated in 1887 by a French medical student, Laurent Chabry, who observed that blastomeres from tunicate embryos still form expected structures even when isolated. This indicated that the "instructions" for cell fate were already present within the cells themselves. Such asymmetric cell division usually occurs early in embryogenesis.

Positive feedback loops can also reinforce these intrinsic patterns, converting minor asymmetries into stable developmental outcomes. Once the feedback has begun, any small initial signaling is magnified and thus produces an effective patterning mechanism. This is normally what occurs in the case of lateral inhibition in which neighboring cells induce specification via inhibitory or inducing signals (see Notch signaling). This kind of positive feedback at the single cell level and tissue level is responsible for symmetry breaking, which is an all-or-none process whereas once the symmetry is broken, the cells involved become very different. Symmetry breaking leads to a bistable system where the cell or cells involved "remember" past signals and commit to specific developmental paths. The determined cells continue on their particular fate even after the initial stimulatory/inhibitory signal is gone, giving the cells a memory of the signal.

Experiments involving cell ablation further support this model. If ablation of a tissue from a certain cell occurred, the cell will have a missing part. As a result, the removed tissue was autonomously specified since the cell was not able to make up for the missing part. Furthermore, if specific cells were isolated in a petri dish from the whole structure, these cells will still form the structure or tissue they were going to form initially. In other words, the signaling to form a specific tissue is within the tissue, not coming from a central organ or system.

=== Conditional specification ===
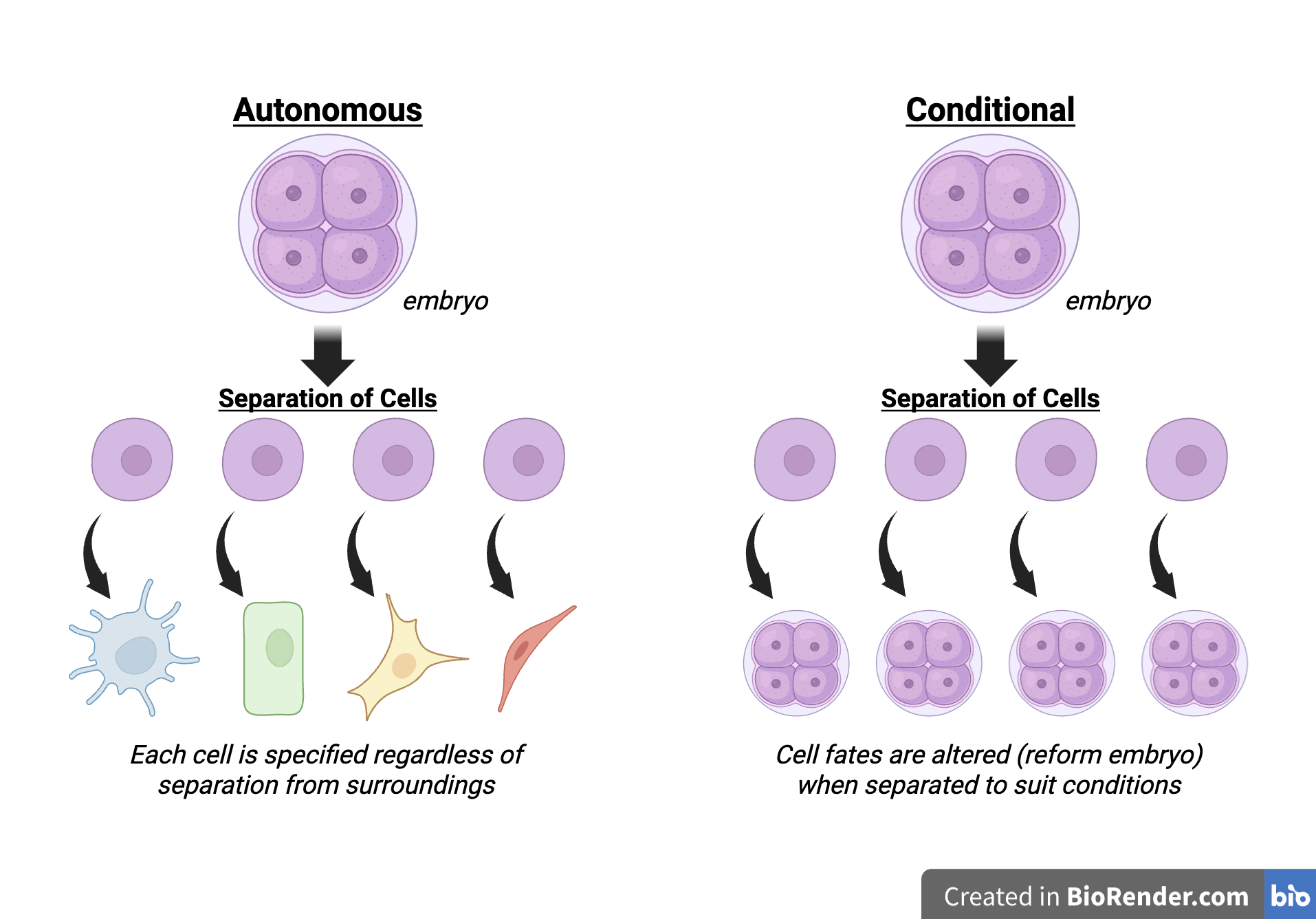
Autonomous vs conditional specification

In contrast to the autonomous specification, conditional specification is a cell-extrinsic process that relies on cues and interactions between cells or from concentration-gradients of morphogens. Inductive interactions between neighboring cells are the most common mode of tissue patterning. In this mechanism, one or two cells from a group of cells with the same developmental potential are exposed to a signal (morphogen) from outside the group. Only the cells exposed to the signal are induced to follow a different developmental pathway, leaving the rest of the equivalence group unchanged. Another mechanism that determines the cell fate is regional determination (see Regional specification). As implied by the name, this specification occurs based on where within the embryo the cell is positioned, also known as its positional value. This was first observed when mesoderm was taken from the prospective thigh region of a chick embryo, and grafted onto the wing region. It did not adopt wing characteristics but instead developed toe structures; its fate determined by local signals from its new environment.

In conditionally specified cells, the designated cell requires signaling from an exterior cell, which shows that cells can display plasticity early in development. If a tissue is ablated, neighboring cells will be able to regenerate or signal to reform the lost tissue. For instance, if belly tissue was removed and transplanted in the back, it may contribute to back structures rather than retaining its original identity. This result is seen because the surrounding cells and tissues influence the newly forming cell. This plasticity is a defining feature of conditional specification and underlies many regenerative and compensatory processes in development.

=== Syncytial specification ===
This type of a specification is a hybrid of the autonomous and conditional that occurs in insects. This method involves the action of morphogen gradients within the syncytium. As there are no cell boundaries in the syncytium, these morphogens can influence nuclei in a concentration-dependent manner. It was discovered that cellularization of the blastoderm took place either during or before the specifications of body regions. Also, one cell could contain more than one nucleus due to fusion of multiple uninuclear cells. As a result, the variable cleavage of the cells will make the cells hard to be committed or determined to one cell fate. At the end of cellularization, the autonomously specified cells become distinguished from the conditionally specified ones.

== Epigenetic regulation ==
Cell fate determination is under significant influence by epigenetic mechanisms that regulate gene expression without altering the underlying DNA sequence. Epigenetic modifications, such as DNA methylation, histone modifications, and chromatin remodeling, play crucial roles in maintaining cellular identity and guiding differentiation. DNA methylation typically represses gene activity, while histone acetylation generally enhances transcription by loosening chromatin structure. Chromatin remodelers work by dynamically altering nucleosome positioning, making specific genomic regions accessible or inaccessible to transcription factors. These epigenetic changes are orchestrated by a network of enzymes, including DNA methyltransferases, histone acetyltransferases, and chromatin remodelers, which respond to both intrinsic signals and extrinsic cues from the cellular microenvironment. Modifications such as these prompt cells to adapt in response to developmental signals or environmental changes, which points toward a significant role of epigenetics in regulation of processes like fate determination.

== See also ==
- Plant embryonic development
- Sonic Hedgehog
- Systems biology
