= Oscar Hertwig =

German zoologist and professor (1849–1922)

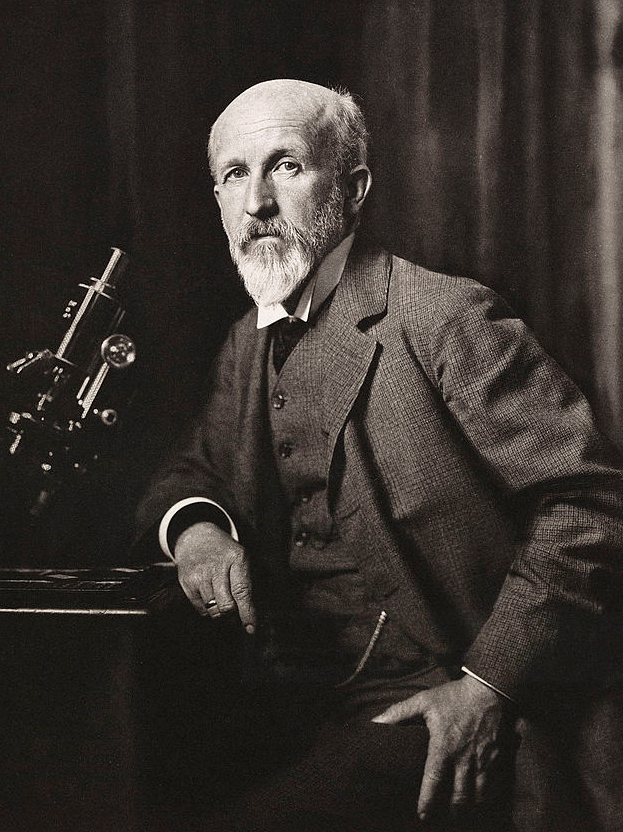
- Oscar Hertwig by Nicola Perscheid, 1906
- Born: 21 April 1849; Friedberg, Hesse
- Died: 25 October 1922 (aged 73); Berlin, Germany
- Known for: Study of protists
- Scientific career
- Fields: Zoology

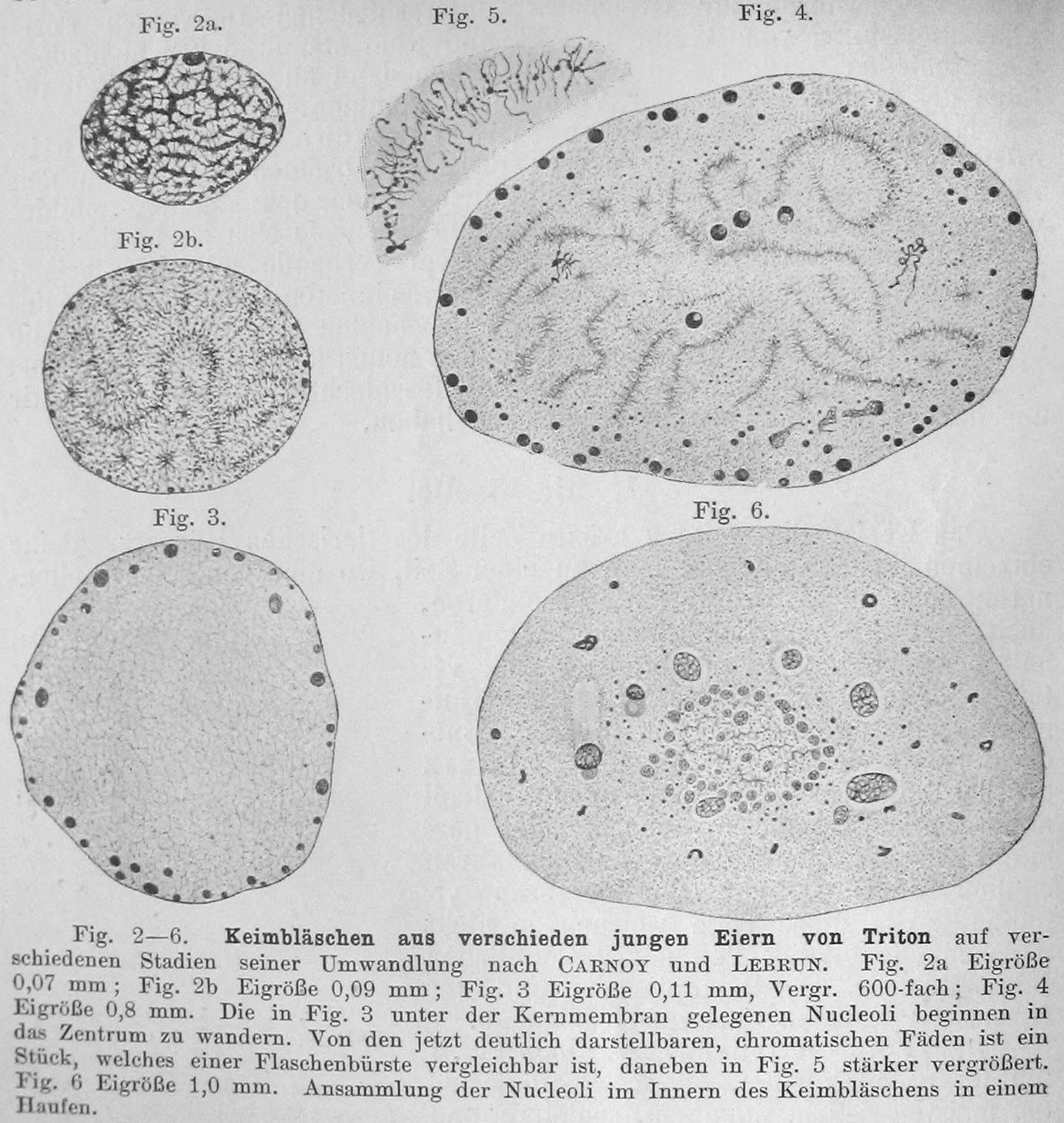
Illustration from O. Hertwig's book Lehrbuch der Entwicklungsgeschichte des Menschen und der Wirbeltiere (Textbook of developmental history of humans and vertebrates), 1906.

Oscar Hertwig (21 April 1849 – 25 October 1922) was a German embryologist and zoologist known for his research in developmental biology and evolution. Hertwig is credited as the first person to observe sexual reproduction at the cellular level, by looking at the cells of sea urchins under the microscope.

== Biography ==
Hertwig was the elder brother of zoologist-professor Richard Hertwig (1850–1937). The Hertwig brothers were the most eminent scholars of Ernst Haeckel (and Carl Gegenbaur) from the University of Jena. They were independent of Haeckel's philosophical speculations but took his ideas positively to widen their concepts in zoology. Initially, between 1879 and 1883, they performed embryological studies, especially on the theory of the coelom (1881), the fluid-filled body cavity. These problems were based on the phylogenetic theorems of Haeckel, i.e., the biogenic theory (German = biogenetisches Grundgesetz), and the "gastraea theory".

Within 10 years, the two brothers moved apart to the north and south of Germany. Oscar Hertwig later became a professor of anatomy in 1888 in Berlin; however, Richard Hertwig had moved 3 years prior, becoming a professor of zoology in Munich from 1885 to 1925, at Ludwig-Maximilians-Universität München (LMU), where he served the last 40 years of his 50-year career as a professor at 4 universities.

Hertwig was a leader in the field of comparative and causal animal-developmental history. He also wrote a leading textbook. By studying sea urchins he proved that fertilization occurs due to the fusion of a sperm and egg cell. He recognized the role of the cell nucleus during inheritance and chromosome reduction during meiosis: in 1876, he published his findings that fertilization includes the penetration of a spermatozoon into an egg cell. Hermann Fol also observed this in the same year. Hertwig's experiments with frog eggs revealed the 'long axis rule', or Hertwig rule. According to this rule, cell divides along its long axis.

In 1885 Hertwig wrote that nuclein (later called nucleic acid) is the substance responsible not only for fertilization but also for the transmission of hereditary characteristics. This early suggestion was proven correct much later in 1944 by the Avery–MacLeod–McCarty experiment which showed that this is indeed the role of the nucleic acid DNA.

While Hertwig was interested in developmental biology and evolution, he was opposed to chance as assumed in Charles Darwin's theory. His most important theoretical book was: "Das Werden der Organismen, eine Widerlegung der Darwinschen Zufallslehre" (Jena, 1916) (translation: "The Origin of Organisms – a Refutation of Darwin's Theory of Chance").

Hertwig was elected a member of the Royal Swedish Academy of Sciences in 1903.

In 1905, Hertwig was named an honorary member of the American Association for Anatomy.

Hertwig is known as Oscar Hedwig in the book "Who discovered what when" by David Ellyard. A history of the discovery of fertilization for mammals including scientists like Hertwig and other workers is given by the book "The Mammalian Egg" by Austin.

== Works ==
- Die Elemente der Entwicklungslehre des Menschen und der Wirbeltiere : Anleitung und Repetitorium für Studierende und Ärzte (The elements of the developmental biology of humans and vertebrates: A guide and review for students and physicians). Fischer, Jena 5th ed. 1915 Digital edition by the University and State Library Düsseldorf
- Das Problem der Befruchtung und der Isotropie des Eies. Eine Theorie der Vererbung (The problem of fertilization and the isotropy of the egg. A theory of heredity). Jenaische Zeitschrift fur Naturwissenschaft 18, 276–318.

== See also ==
- Epigenetics
- Evolution – concepts and history of evolutionary thought

== Sources ==
- Gill, P (1990), "Nature and nurture.", Med. J. Aust., vol. 152, no. 7 (published 2 April 1990), p. 386, doi:10.5694/j.1326-5377.1990.tb125235.x, PMID 2093819, S2CID 8081330
- Weindling, P (1980), "Social concepts in anatomy: theories of the cell state of Oscar Hertwig (1849–1922) and Wilhelm Waldeyer (1836–1921).", The Society for the Social History of Medicine Bulletin, vol. 26 (published June 1980), pp. 15–7, PMID 11610800
- Gras, N; Verchere, M; Santoro, J P (1975), "[The Oscar Hertwig centenary]", Revue d'Odonto-stomatologie, vol. 4, no. 2, pp. 135–40, PMID 1103253
- Churchill, F B (1970), "Hertwig, Weismann, and the meaning of reduction division circa 1890.", Isis; an International Review Devoted to the History of Science and Its Cultural Influences, vol. 61, no. 4, pp. 429–57, doi:10.1086/350680, PMID 4942056, S2CID 46321527
- Cremer, T. 1985. Von der Zellenlehre zur Chromosomentheorie. Springer Vlg., Heidelberg. This German book can be downloaded here .
- Krafft, F., and A. Meyer-Abich (ed.). 1970. Große Naturwissenschaftler – Biographisches Lexikon. Fischer Bücherei GmbH, Frankfurt a. M. & Hamburg.
- Mol. Cell. Biol.-lecture, Heidelberg, D.-H. Lankenau. Early to recent key-discoveries: From Germline Theory to Modern Gene Modification.
- Weindling, Paul. 1991. Darwinism and Social Darwinism in Imperial Germany: The Contribution of the Cell Biologist Oscar Hertwig (1849–1922). Forschungen zur Medizin- und Biologiegeschichte vol. 3, (Stuttgart: G. Fischer in association with Akademie der Wissenschaften und der Literatur Mainz, 1991).
