= Teloblast =

Progenitor cell in annelid development

A teloblast is a large cell in the embryos of clitellate annelids which asymmetrically divide to form many smaller cells known as blast cells. These blast cells further proliferate and differentiate to form the segmental tissues of the annelid. Teloblasts are well studied in leeches, though they are also present in the other major class of clitellates: the oligochaetes.

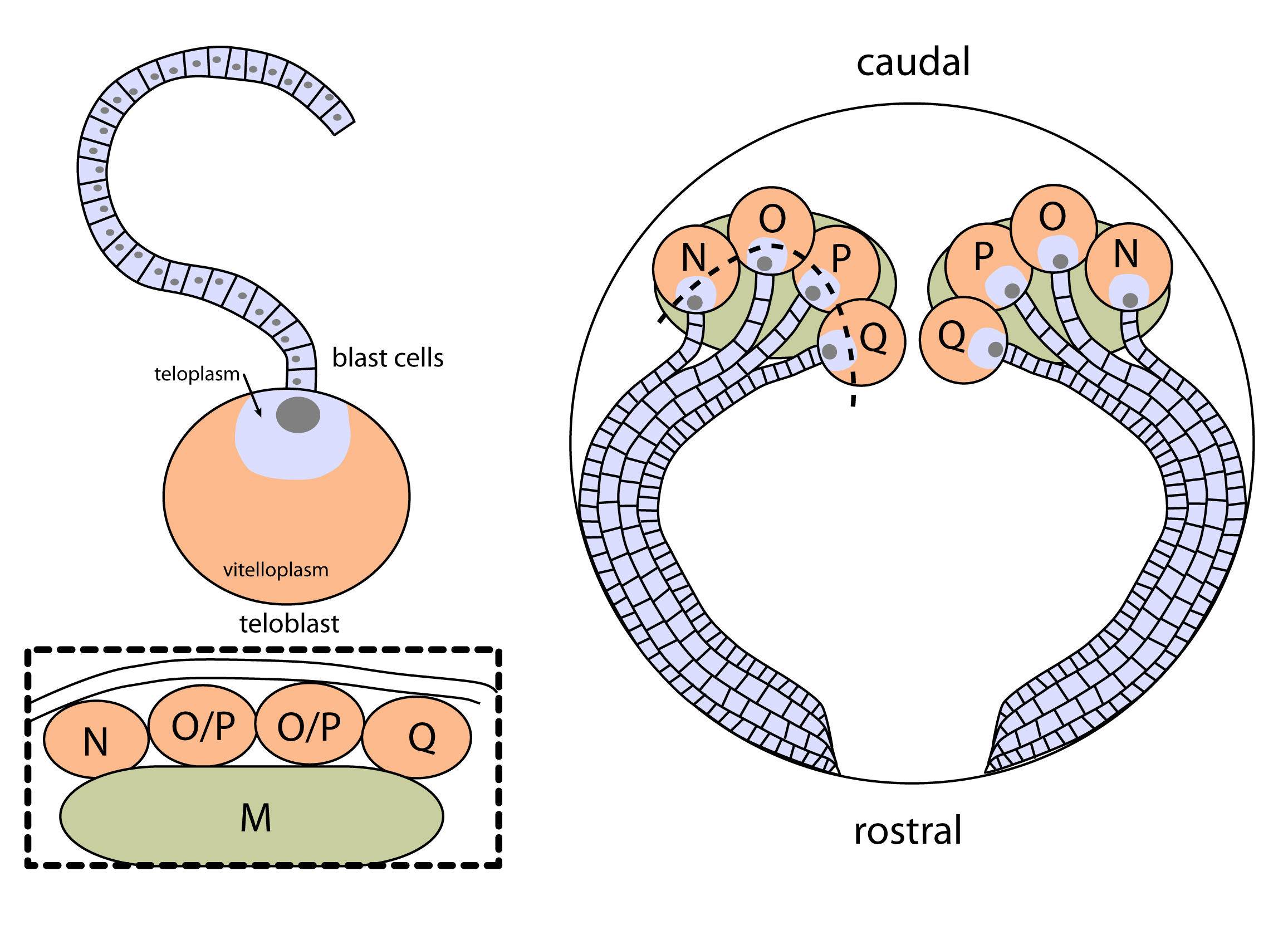
Teloblasts divide asymmetrically to form small blast cells which wrap around the embryo and extend rostrally. Here, the embryo is shown at late stage 7 (upper right). The N, O, P, Q, and M teloblasts are always positioned in the same relative orientations (lower left).

== Developmental role and morphology ==
All teloblasts are specified from the D quadrant macromere after the second round of divisions post-fertilization. They are larger than the other cells that result from cleavage of macromere D'. There are five pairs of teloblasts, one on each side of the embryo. Four of the teloblasts (N, O, P, and Q) give rise to ectodermal tissue and one pair (M) gives rise to mesodermal tissue. The column of blast cells arising out of each teloblast is known as a bandlet. All five bandlets coalesce into one germinal band on each side of the embryo, extending out from the teloblast towards the head (in the rostral direction). There is a ventral plate of blast cells where the lateral columns meet. The teloblasts are located at the rear of the embryo.

Teloblasts have two separate cytoplasmic domains: the teloplasm and the vitelloplasm. The teloplasm contains the nucleus, ribosomes, mitochondria, and other subcellular organelles. The vitelloplasm contains mostly yolk platelets. Only the teloplasm gets passed onto the daughter stem cells after cell division. The teloplasm also includes maternal RNA transcripts.

== O/P specification ==
The O and P teloblasts are specified from two separate but identical precursors, which form an equivalence group. These two precursor cells are termed O/P cells for their ability to become either O or P teloblasts. Signals from the surrounding cells act to specify which fate the teloblasts and their progeny take on. Interactions with the q bandlet, however transient, can induce the p fate in the adjacent o/p bandlet. In some species (i.e. Helobdella triserialis), the provisional epithelium covering the cells plays a role in inducing the O fate. In the absence of cell-cell interactions, the O/P precursors will become O teloblasts. O and P bandlets exhibit very different mitotic patterns (see figure) which are used to identify them in experimental manipulations.

Experimental results in Tubifex hattai suggest that there is not an equivalence group for O and P in these worms, but instead the P lineage is committed at its birth from the O/P proteloblast stage, while the O lineage is induced by the P teloblast. In the absence of the P teloblast, the pluripotent O teloblast becomes P specified. In Helobdella, the O/P proteloblasts generate four blast cells with segmental progeny by asymmetric division before a symmetric division into O/P teloblasts. Helobdella austensis appears to have an additional M-lineage-sourced signal that promotes P lineage differentiation in addition to bone morphogenic protein molecular signaling that is sourced from Q lineage cells and also helps specify P fate.

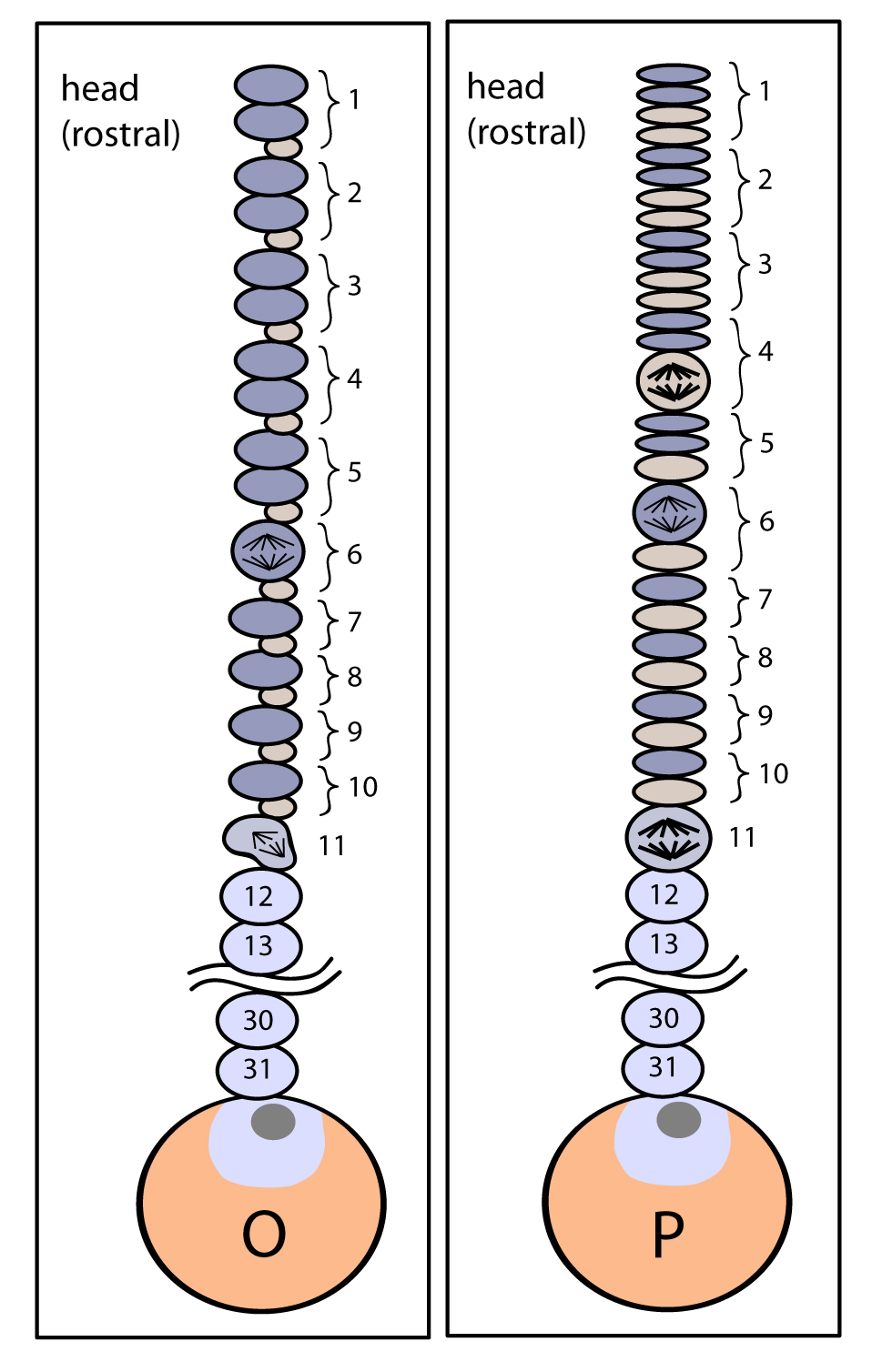
O and P teloblasts have very different cell division patterns. The patterns of stereotyped mitoses for other teloblasts can be found here:

== Segmental fates ==
The N and Q teloblasts contribute two blast cells per segment, one making up the anterior half of the segment, the second making up the posterior half of the segment. The O, P, and M lineages contribute one blast cell per segment, but the contributions from each blast cell span a segmental boundary. These segmental boundaries were discovered by injecting teloblasts with cell lineage tracers after a few blast cells had already been generated. During development, the N and Q bandlets, which eventually have 64 blast cells each, slide past the O, P, and M bandlets, which only have 32 cells. Thus, the segmental boundaries within each bandlet are already specified before all the bandlets come into complete register.
