= Tissue growth =

Biologic term on tissues

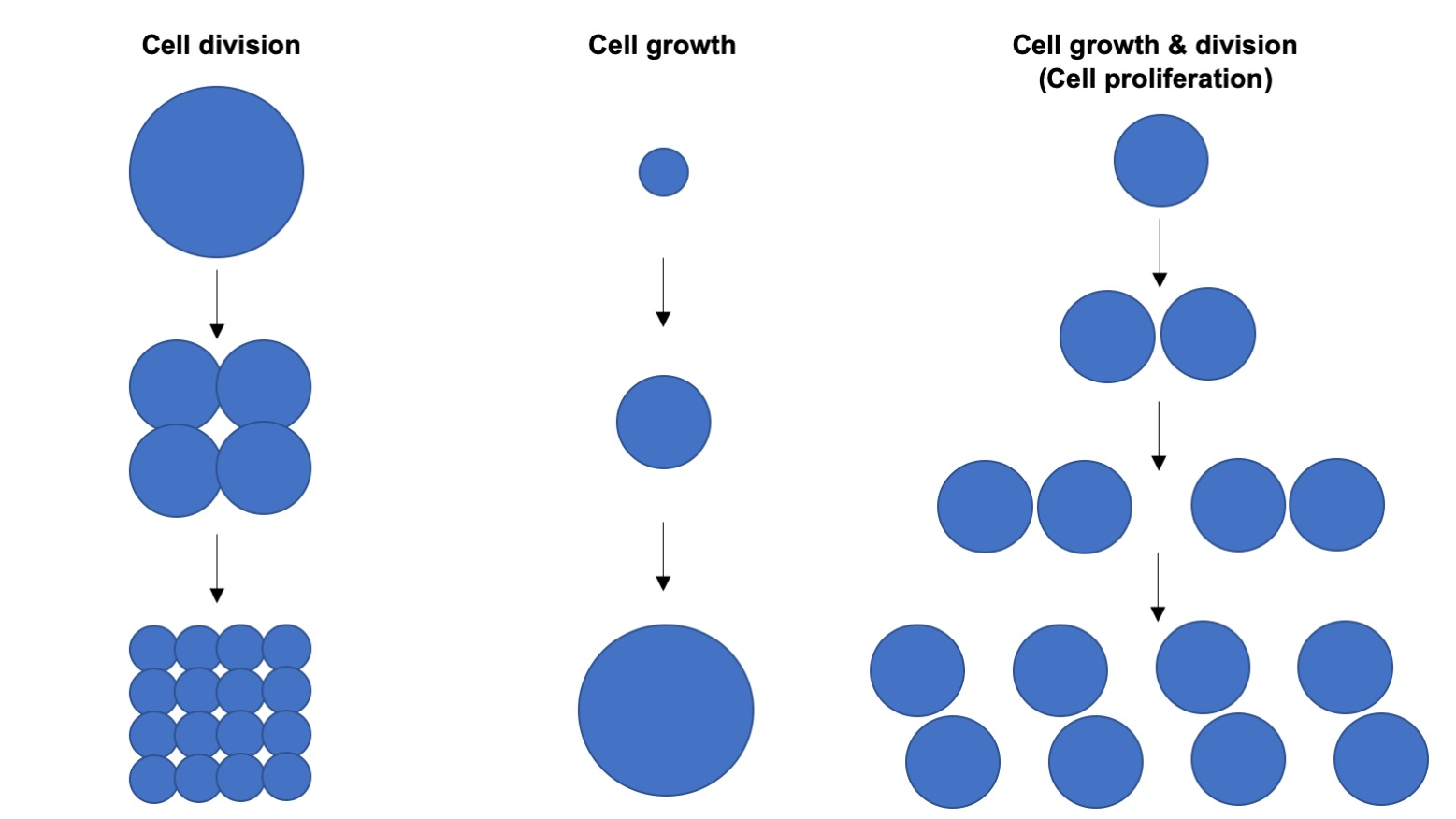
Cell growth, division & proliferation

Tissue growth is the biological process by which a tissue increases its size. In animals, tissue growth occurs during embryonic development, post-natal growth, and tissue regeneration. The fundamental cellular basis for tissue growth is the process of cell proliferation, which involves both cell growth and cell division occurring in parallel.

How cell proliferation is controlled during tissue growth to determine final tissue size is an open question in biology. Uncontrolled tissue growth is a cause of cancer.

Differential rates of cell proliferation within an organ can influence proportions, as can the orientation of cell divisions, and thus tissue growth contributes to shaping tissues along with other mechanisms of tissue morphogenesis.

== Mechanisms of tissue growth control in animals ==
=== Mechanical control of tissue growth in animal skin ===
For some animal tissues, such as mammalian skin, it is clear that the growth of the skin is ultimately determined by the size of the body whose surface area the skin covers. This suggests that cell proliferation in skin stem cells within the basal layer is likely to be mechanically controlled to ensure that the skin covers the surface of the entire body. Growth of the body causes mechanical stretching of the skin, which is sensed by skin stem cells within the basal layer and consequently leads to both an increased rate of cell proliferation as well as promoting the planar orientation of stem cell divisions to produce new skin stem cells, rather than only producing differentiating supra-basal daughter cells.

Cell proliferation in skin stem cells within the basal layer can be driven by the mechanically-regulated YAP/TAZ family of transcriptional co-activators, which bind to TEAD-family DNA binding transcription factors in the nucleus to activate target gene expression and thereby drive cell proliferation.

For other animal tissues, such as the bones of the skeleton or the internal mammalian organs intestine, pancreas, kidney or brain, it remains unclear how developmental gene regulatory networks encoded in the genome lead to organs of such different sizes and proportions.

=== Hormonal control of tissue growth in the entire animal body ===
Although different animal tissues grow at different rates and produce organs of very different proportions, the overall growth rate of the entire animal body can be modulated by circulating hormones of the Insulin/IGF-1 family, which activate the PI3K/AKT/mTOR pathway in many cells of the body to increase the average rate of both cell growth and cell division, leading to increased cell proliferation rates in many tissues. In mammals, production of IGF-1 is induced by another circulating hormone called Growth Hormone. Excessive production of Growth Hormone or IGF-1 is responsible for giantism while insufficient production of these hormones is responsible for dwarfism.

=== Developmental control of tissue growth during adult tissue homeostasis ===
Adult animal tissues such as skin or intestine maintain their size but undergo constant turnover of cells by proliferation of stem cells and progenitor cells while undergoing an equivalent loss of differentiated daughter cells via sloughing off. Gradients of Wnt signaling pathway activity appear to have a fundamental role in maintaining proliferation of stem and progenitor cells, at least in the intestine, and possibly also in skin.

=== Regenerative tissue growth after wounding or other types of damage ===
Upon tissue damage, there is an upregulation in the activity of many pathways that control tissue growth, including the YAP/TAZ pathway, Wnt signaling pathway, and growth factors that activate the PI3K/AKT/mTOR pathway.
