= Hertwig rule =

Hertwig's rule, or the long axis rule states that a cell divides along its long axis. Introduced by the German zoologist Oscar Hertwig in 1884, the rule emphasizes the cell shape as a default mechanism of spindle apparatus orientation. Hertwig's rule predicts cell division orientation, which is important for tissue architecture, cell fate and morphogenesis.

== Discovery ==
Hertwig's experiments studied the orientation of frog egg divisions. The frog egg has a round shape and the first division occurs in a random orientation. Hertwig compressed the egg between two parallel plates. The compression forced the egg to change its shape from round to elongated. Hertwig noticed that elongated egg divides not randomly, but orthogonally to its long axis. The new daughter cells were formed along the longest axis of the cell. This observation thus became known as 'Hertwig's rule' or 'long axis rule'.

== Confirmation and mechanism ==
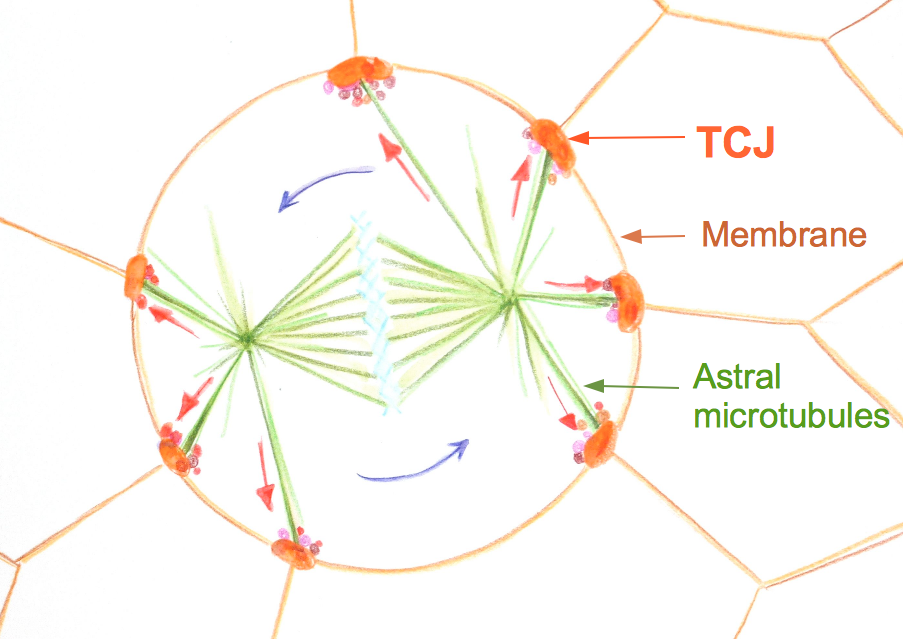
Cartoon of the dividing epithelium cell surrounded by epithelium tissue. Spindle apparatus rotates inside the cell. The rotation is a result of astral microtubules pulling towards tri-cellular-junctions (TCJ), signaling centers localized at the regions where three cells meet.

Recent studies in animal and plant systems support the 'long axis rule'. The studied systems include the mouse embryo, Drosophila epithelium, Xenopus blastomeres (Strauss 2006), MDCK cell monolayers and plants (Gibson et al., 2011). The mechanism of the 'long axis rule' relies on interphase cell long axis sensing. However, during division many animal cell types undergo cell rounding, causing the long axis to disappear as the cell becomes round. It is at this rounding stage that the decision on the orientation of the cell division is made by the spindle apparatus. The spindle apparatus rotates in the round cell and after several minutes the spindle position is stabilised preferentially along the interphase cell long axis. The cell then divides along the spindle apparatus orientation. The first insights into how cells could remember their long axis came from studies on the Drosophila epithelium. The study indicated the participation of tricellular junctions (TCJs) in determining the spindle orientation. TCJs localized at the regions where three or more cells meet. As cells round up during mitosis, TCJs serve as spatial landmarks. The orientation of TCJs remains stable, independent of the shape changes associated with cell rounding. The positions of TCJs encode information about interphase cell shape anisotropy to orient division in the rounded mitotic cell. However this study is limited to only one type of epithelia in Drosophila melanogaster and has not been shown to be true in other epithelial types.

== Mechanobiology ==
It has been shown that mechanical force can cause cells to divide against their long axis and instead with the direction of mechanical stretch in MDCK monolayers.

== Importance ==
Cell divisions along 'long axis' are proposed to be implicated in the morphogenesis, tissue response to stresses and tissue architecture. Division along the long cell axis reduces global tissue stress more rapidly than random divisions or divisions along the axis of mechanical stress. Long-axis division contributes to the formation of isotropic cell shapes within the monolayer.
