= HORMAD2 =

Protein-coding gene in the species Homo sapiens

Identifiers
- Aliases: HORMAD2, CT46.2, HORMA domain containing 2
- External IDs: MGI: 1923078; HomoloGene: 45130; GeneCards: HORMAD2; OMA:HORMAD2 - orthologs

Gene location (Human)
Chr.	Chromosome 22 (human)
Band	22q12.2	Start	30,080,464 bp
Band	22q12.2	End	30,177,075 bp

Gene location (Mouse)
Chr.	Chromosome 11 (mouse)
Band	11|11 A1	Start	4,295,814 bp
Band	11|11 A1	End	4,391,105 bp
RNA expression pattern
Bgee	Human / Mouse (ortholog); Top expressed in: right testis; left testis; sperm; testicle; retinal pigment epithelium; mucosa of ileum; tibialis anterior muscle; right lobe of liver; caudate nucleus; ventricular zone / Top expressed in: spermatocyte; spermatid; embryo; embryo; zygote; yolk sac; morula; secondary oocyte; seminiferous tubule; epiblast; More reference expression data
BioGPS	n/a
Orthologs
Species	Human	Mouse
Entrez	150280	75828
Ensembl	ENSG00000176635	ENSMUSG00000020419
UniProt	Q8N7B1	Q5SQP1
RefSeq (mRNA)	NM_152510; NM_001329457; NM_001329458	NM_029458
RefSeq (protein)	NP_001316386; NP_001316387; NP_689723	NP_083734
Location (UCSC)	Chr 22: 30.08 – 30.18 Mb	Chr 11: 4.3 – 4.39 Mb
PubMed search
- Wikidata
View/Edit Human	View/Edit Mouse

HORMA domain containing 2 is a protein that in humans is encoded by the HORMAD2 gene.
