= HORMAD1 =

Protein found in humans

Identifiers
- Aliases: HORMAD1, CT46, NOHMA, HORMA domain containing 1
- External IDs: OMIM: 609824; MGI: 1915231; GeneCards: HORMAD1

Gene location (Human)
Chr.	Chromosome 1 (human)
Band	1q21.3	Start	150,698,060 bp
Band	1q21.3	End	150,720,895 bp

Gene location (Mouse)
Chr.	Chromosome 3 (mouse)
Band	3|3 F2.1	Start	95,466,988 bp
Band	3|3 F2.1	End	95,494,982 bp
RNA expression pattern
Bgee	Human / Mouse (ortholog); Top expressed in: right testis; left testis; gonad; sperm; testicle; monocyte; granulocyte; skin of hip; mucosa of esophagus; appendix / Top expressed in: spermatocyte; spermatid; testicle; morula; embryo; blastocyst; embryo; ovarian follicle; epiblast; secondary oocyte; More reference expression data
BioGPS	n/a
Orthologs
Databases	NCBI: entry; OMA: entry
Species	Human	Mouse
Entrez	84072	67981
Ensembl	ENSG00000143452	ENSMUSG00000028109
UniProt	Q86X24	Q9D5T7
RefSeq (mRNA)	NM_001199829; NM_032132	NM_001289532; NM_001289534; NM_001289537; NM_026489; NM_001373886
RefSeq (protein)	NP_001186758; NP_115508	NP_001276461; NP_001276463; NP_001276466; NP_080765; NP_001360815
Location (UCSC)	Chr 1: 150.7 – 150.72 Mb	Chr 3: 95.47 – 95.49 Mb
PubMed search
- Wikidata
View/Edit Human	View/Edit Mouse

HORMA domain-containing protein 1 (HORMAD1) also known as cancer/testis antigen 46 (CT46) is a protein that in humans is encoded by the HORMAD1 gene.

== Function ==
HORMAD1 is a cancer/testis antigen that plays a key role in meiotic progression. It has shown to regulate three different functions during meiosis. Specifically, it:

1. Ensures that sufficient numbers of processed DNA double-strand breaks (DSBs) are available for successful homology search by increasing the steady-state numbers of single-stranded DSB ends
2. Promotes synaptonemal-complex formation independently of its role in homology search.
3. Plays a key role in the male mid-pachytene checkpoint and the female meiotic prophase checkpoint: required for efficient build-up of ATR activity on unsynapsed chromosome regions, a process believed to form the basis of meiotic silencing of unsynapsed chromatin (MSUC) and meiotic prophase quality control in both sexes (By similarity)

== Role in cancer ==
HORMAD1 has been shown to have a role in triple-negative breast cancers and in lung adenocarcinomas. In particular, the Watkins et al., paper suggested that overexpression of HORMAD1 is a driver of homologous recombination repair deficiency in these types of breast cancers, and induced widespread allelic imbalances in the genome with implications for platinum and PARP inhibitor sensitivity.
