= Equivalence group =

Cell population in developmental biology

An equivalence group is a set of unspecified cells that have the same developmental potential or ability to adopt various fates. Our current understanding suggests that equivalence groups are limited to cells of the same ancestry, also known as sibling cells. Often, cells of an equivalence group adopt different fates from one another.

Equivalence groups assume various potential fates in two general, non-mutually exclusive ways. One mechanism, induction, occurs when a signal originating from outside of the equivalence group specifies a subset of the naïve cells. Another mode, known as lateral inhibition, arises when a signal within an equivalence group causes one cell to adopt a dominant fate while others in the group are inhibited from doing so. In many examples of equivalence groups, both induction and lateral inhibition are used to define patterns of distinct cell types.

Cells of an equivalence group that do not receive a signal adopt a default fate. Alternatively, cells that receive a signal take on different fates. At a certain point, the fates of cells within an equivalence group become irreversibly determined, thus they lose their multipotent potential. The following provides examples of equivalence groups studied in nematodes and ascidians.

== Vulva precursor cell equivalence group ==
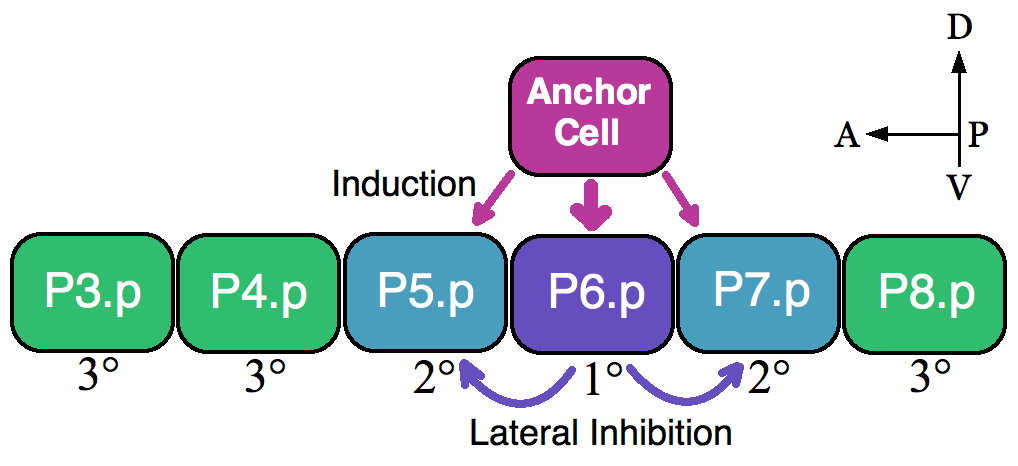
Model for the determination of the VPCs (cells P3.p-P8.p) in C. elegans. An inductive signal from the anchor cell via LIN-3 determines P6.p to adopt the 1°. Then, the lateral signal LIN-12 causes P5.p and P5.7 to become 2°. The other VPCs do not receive an inductive signal and are fated as 3°. Anterior is to the left.

=== Introduction ===
A classic example of an equivalence group is the vulva precursor cells (VPCs) of nematodes. In Caenorhabditis elegans self-fertilized eggs exit the body through the vulva. This organ develops from a subset of cell of an equivalence group consisting of six VPCs, P3.p-P8.p, which lie ventrally along the anterior-posterior axis. In this example a single overlying somatic cell, the anchor cell, induces nearby VPCs to take on vulva fates 1° (P6.p) and 2° (P5.p and P7.p). VPCs that are not induced form the 3° lineage (P3.p, P4.p and P8.p), which make epidermal cells that fuse to a large syncytial epidermis (see image).

The six VPCs form an equivalence group because all of the six cells are competent to take on any of the available fates (1°, 2°, and 3°) dependent on their proximity to the anchor cell. Ablation experiments indicate that all VPCs are able to adopt vulva fates. For example, if the P6.p cell that normally becomes 1° is ablated then the VPC closest to the anchor cell, either P5.p or P7.p, assumes the 1° fate. Furthermore, if all VPCs are destroyed except the most anterior P3.p cell then the anchor cell designates this cell the 1° fate. However, if the anchor cell is killed, in the absence of an inductive signal, then all of the VPCs assume the default 3° lineage.

=== Molecular mechanism ===
The anchor cell directly induces the vulva fates by secreting the epidermal growth factor (EGF)-like ligand LIN-3. The P6.p cell receives the LIN-3 signal via the receptor tyrosine kinase LET-23 (P5.p and P7.p also receive LIN-3 but to a lesser extent). Activation of LET-23 in P6.p results in the activation of LIN-12 (Notch) in P5.p and P7.p. Experimental evidence shows that LIN-12 is necessary and sufficient for the formation of the 2° fate. Through lateral inhibition LIN-12 prevents the P5.p and P7.p cells from adopting the 1° lineage. Thus, in this example both inductive EGF signaling and lateral Notch activation pattern the VPC equivalence group.

== Ascidian pigment precursor equivalence group ==
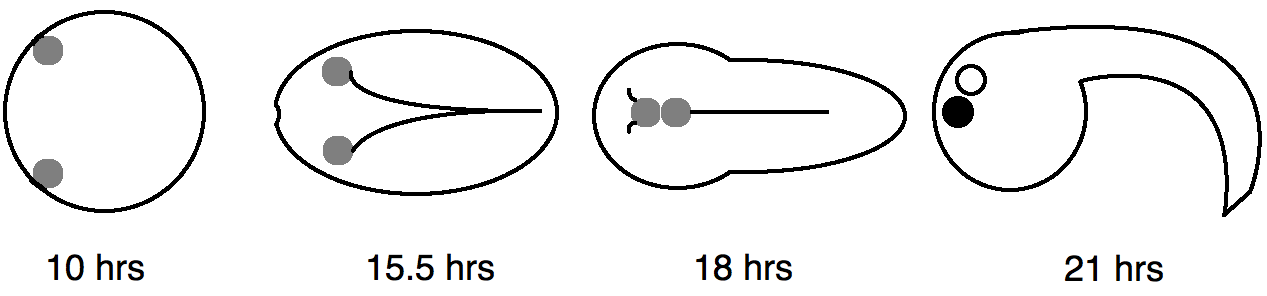
Two bilateral pigment precursor cells form an equivalence group that eventually interacts to seal mutually exclusive fates (otolith and ocellus). Shown is a timeline of the developing Halocythia roretzi embryo (anterior is to the left). Pigment precursor cells (gray circles) remain equivalent until they align after neurulation. At 21 hours post fertilization the ocellus (white circle) and otolith (black circle) are determined.

=== Introduction ===
The larvae of ascidians (sea squirts) contain a pair of sensory pigment cells known as the otolith and ocellus. The otolith is used to sense gravity, whereas the ocellus responds to light. During embryogenesis the otolith and ocellus develop from two bilateral equivalent precursors. Either the left or right pigment precursor cell has equal probability of developing into the otolith or ocellus. The decision to adopt either fate is determined after neural tube closure during the early tailbud stage (see image), via a poorly defined mechanism of induction.

During normal development, after neural tube closure, the pigment precursors align dorsally along the anterior-posterior axis of the neural tube. Whichever cell aligns anteriorly will become the otolith, while the posterior cell will form the ocellus. In the absence of cell-cell interactions both cells develop into ocelli, which is the default fate.

=== Experimental methods for studying equivalence in Halocynthia roretzi ===
To elucidate whether the fates of the otolith and ocellus are determined in the early embryo or after the precursors align during neural tube closure, ablation and drug treatment techniques were used in the ascidian species Halocythia roretzi.

Cells that are labeled with fluorescein isothiocyanate-dextran (FDX) can be selectively photoablated by fluorescent excitation. When one FDX labeled pigment precursor cells is photoablated during the mid-neurula stage (15 hrs) the other will almost always develop into an ocellus. However, if the ablations are performed during the late tailbud stage (22.5 hrs) then the remaining cell has an equal likelihood of becoming an otolith or ocellus.

Inhibiting cell division and morphogenesis with cytochalasin B is another method used to determine when the pigment precursor equivalence group is specified. Cytochalasin treatment of early tailbud stage embryos (17 hrs), while the two bilateral cells are still separated, results in both cells becoming ocelli. When the drug was used after the two cells aligned at the dorsal midline, the anterior cell developed into the otolith and the posterior cell became the ocellus without exception. Both experiments suggest that fates of the pigment precursor cells are irreversibly determined by approximately the mid-tailbud stage (21 hrs).

== Other equivalence groups ==
Equivalence groups have also been described in the ganglion mother cells in grasshopper and the O/P teloblasts in the leech. Like other instances of equivalence groups, progeny cells are born equivalent and become specified through cell interactions. Equivalence groups are a common theme in the development of many organisms from diverse phyla.
