= CDR2 (gene) =

Protein-coding gene in humans

Identifiers
- Aliases: CDR2, CDR62, Yo, cerebellar degeneration related protein 2
- External IDs: OMIM: 117340; MGI: 1100885; GeneCards: CDR2

Gene location (Human)
Chr.	Chromosome 16 (human)
Band	16p12.2	Start	22,345,936 bp
Band	16p12.2	End	22,437,165 bp

Gene location (Mouse)
Chr.	Chromosome 7 (mouse)
Band	7 F2|7 65.04 cM	Start	120,556,259 bp
Band	7 F2|7 65.04 cM	End	120,581,535 bp
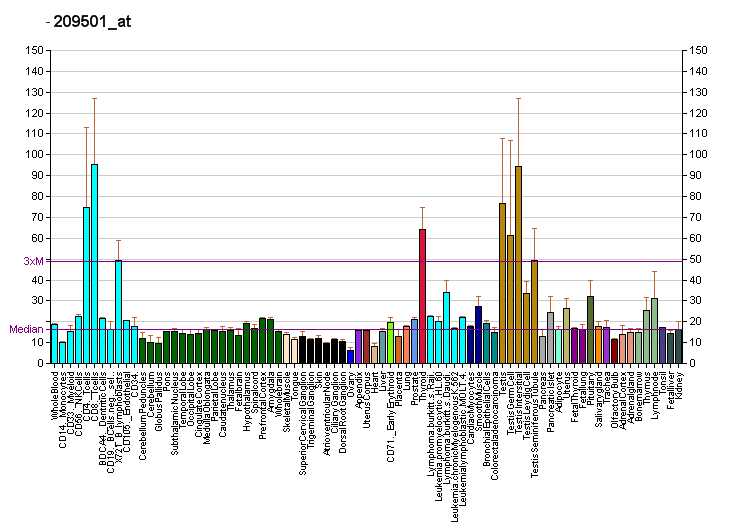
RNA expression pattern
Bgee	Human / Mouse (ortholog); Top expressed in: secondary oocyte; retinal pigment epithelium; jejunal mucosa; Epithelium of choroid plexus; Achilles tendon; sperm; cartilage tissue; left lobe of thyroid gland; right lobe of thyroid gland; gastric mucosa / Top expressed in: blood; fetal liver hematopoietic progenitor cell; saccule; retinal pigment epithelium; tibiofemoral joint; otic placode; neural layer of retina; zygote; otic vesicle; human fetus; More reference expression data
BioGPS	More reference expression data
Orthologs
Databases	NCBI: entry; OMA: entry
Species	Human	Mouse
Entrez	1039	12585
Ensembl	ENSG00000140743	ENSMUSG00000030878
UniProt	Q01850	P97817
RefSeq (mRNA)	NM_001802	NM_007672; NM_001354986
RefSeq (protein)	NP_001793	NP_031698; NP_001341915
Location (UCSC)	Chr 16: 22.35 – 22.44 Mb	Chr 7: 120.56 – 120.58 Mb
PubMed search
- Wikidata
View/Edit Human	View/Edit Mouse

Cerebellar degeneration-related protein 2 is a protein that in humans is encoded by the CDR2 gene. It promotes cerebellar Purkinje cell survival through downregulation of c-Myc, indicating that CDR2 is a protooncogene.

== See also ==
- Cerebellar degeneration-related protein 1
