= Cell proliferation =

Biological process of growth and division

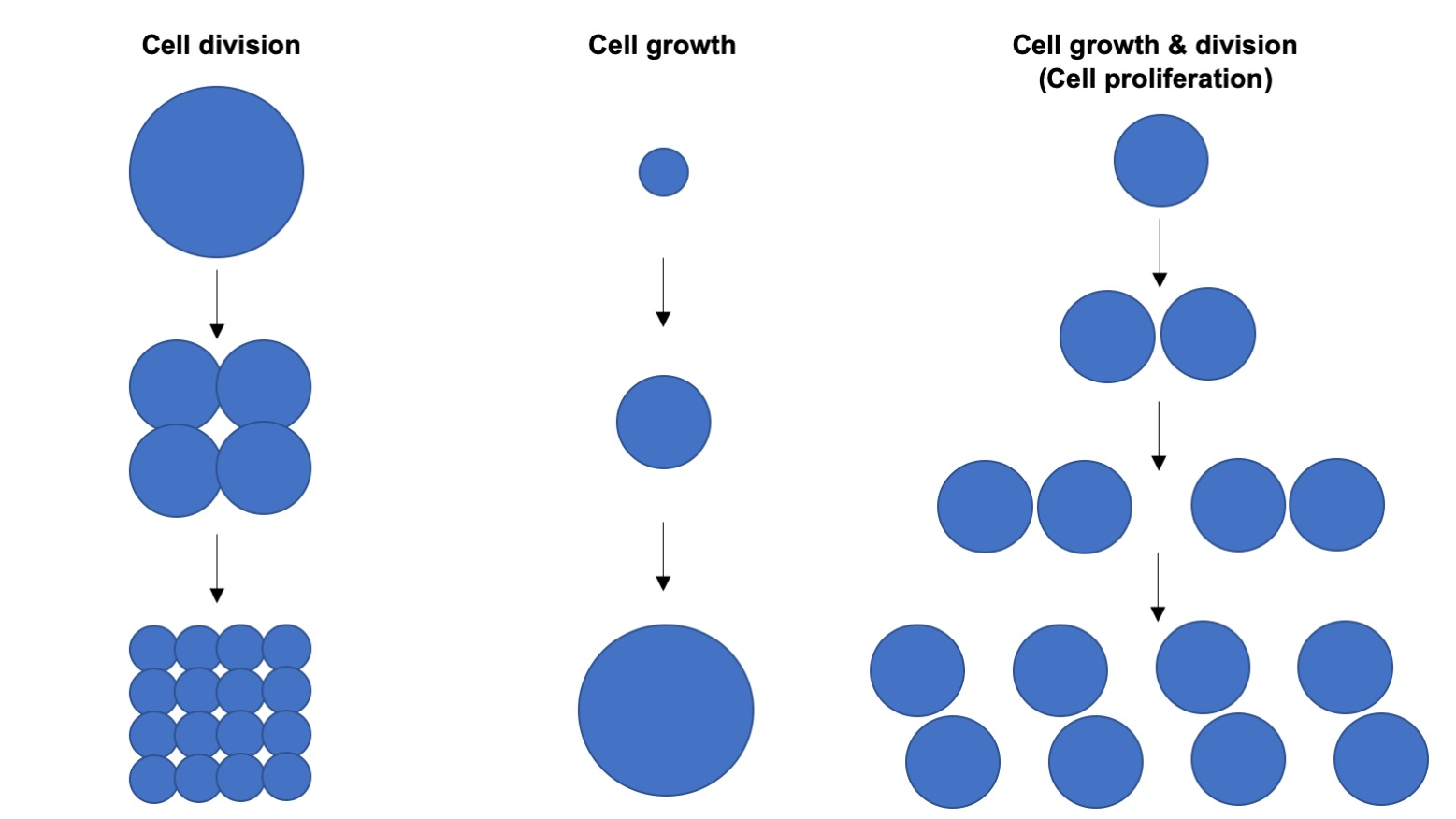
Cell division, growth, and proliferation

Cell proliferation is the process in multicellular organisms by which a cell grows and divides to produce two daughter cells. Cell proliferation leads to an exponential increase in cell number and is therefore a rapid mechanism of tissue growth.

Cell proliferation requires both cell growth and cell division to occur at the same time, such that the average size of cells remains constant in the population. Cell division can occur without cell growth, producing many progressively smaller cells (as in cleavage of the zygote), while cell growth can occur without cell division to produce a single larger cell (as in growth of neurons). Thus, cell proliferation is not synonymous with either cell growth or cell division, despite these terms sometimes being used interchangeably.

Stem cells undergo cell proliferation to produce proliferating "transit amplifying" daughter cells that later differentiate to construct tissues during normal development and tissue growth, during tissue regeneration after damage, or in cancer.

The total number of cells in a population is determined by the rate of cell proliferation minus the rate of cell death.

Cell size depends on both cell growth and cell division, with a disproportionate increase in the rate of cell growth leading to production of larger cells and a disproportionate increase in the rate of cell division leading to production of many smaller cells. Cell proliferation typically involves balanced cell growth and cell division rates that maintain a roughly constant cell size in the exponentially proliferating population of cells. Cell proliferation occurs by combining cell growth with regular "G1-S-G2-M" cell cycles to produce many diploid cell progeny.

In single-celled organisms, cell proliferation is largely responsive to the availability of nutrients in the environment (or laboratory growth medium).

In multicellular organisms, the process of cell proliferation is tightly controlled by gene regulatory networks encoded in the genome and executed mainly by transcription factors including those regulated by signal transduction pathways elicited by growth factors during cell–cell communication in development. In order for growth factors to induce proliferation, sufficient nutrients must be available for cells to synthesize the necessary lipids, proteins, and nucleotides. Cellular sensors, such as mTORC1 integrate signals from growth factors and the availability of nutrients to regulate proliferation. In animals, the intake of nutrients can induce circulating hormones of the insulin/IGF-1 family, which are also considered growth factors, to promote cell proliferation in cells throughout the body that are capable of doing so.

Uncontrolled cell proliferation, leading to an increased proliferation rate, or a failure of cells to arrest their proliferation at the normal time, is a cause of cancer.

== Antiproliferation ==
Cytostatic agents slow or inhibit cell proliferation. (Cytotoxic agents damage or kill living cells. Antineoplastic agents kill or inhibit cancer cells. Anti-metastatic agents deter metastasis.)
