= Cytoplasmic determinant =

Cytoplasmic determinants are special molecules which play a very important role during oocyte maturation, in the female's ovary. During this period of time, some regions of the cytoplasm accumulate some of these cytoplasmic determinants, whose distribution is thus very heterogenic. They play a major role in the development of the embryo's organs. Each type of cell is determined by a particular determinant or group of determinants. Thus, all the organs of the future embryo are distributed and operating well thanks to the right position of the cytoplasmic determinants. The action of the determinants on the blastomeres is one of the most important ones. During the segmentation, cytoplasmic determinants are distributed among the blastomeres, at different times depending on the species and on the type of determinant. Therefore, the daughter cells resulting from the first divisions are totipotent : they can, independently, lead to a complete individual. That is not possible after the cytoplasmic determinants have been distributed in the differentiated blastomeres.

== Mosaic development ==
During the mosaic development, the future embryo contains all the distinct cytoplasmic determinants that are distributed in distinct cells. Regions of the organism differentiate very quickly if each cell contains specific cytoplasmic determinants since the first divisions : then the cell divides to give all the other cell of its type, and the same process happens in all types of cells in the organism. As a result, in the case of the mosaic development, cell totipotence disappears very quickly during segmentation. Indeed, each new created cell determines a new region of the future organism, and it is independent from the other ones : thus development is independent from interaction between cells. It is most of all known in certain animals as nematodes C. elegans, or ascidians (marine animals).

== Regulation development ==
Other animals show regulation development; their cells show totipotence for a longer time. In these animals, cytoplasmic determinants are more rapidly distributed between newly created cells. Mammals are an example of animals that undergo regulation development.

== Presumptive territories map ==
The zygote already contains the future organization of the embryo, through cytoplasmic determinants distribution. Presumptive Territories Maps could be established simply by coloring particular regions of the zygote's cytoplasm.
