= CDR1 (gene) =

Protein-coding gene in humans

Identifiers
- Aliases: CDR1, CDR, CDR34, CDR62A, cerebellar degeneration related protein 1
- External IDs: OMIM: 302650; HomoloGene: 136780; GeneCards: CDR1; OMA:CDR1 - orthologs
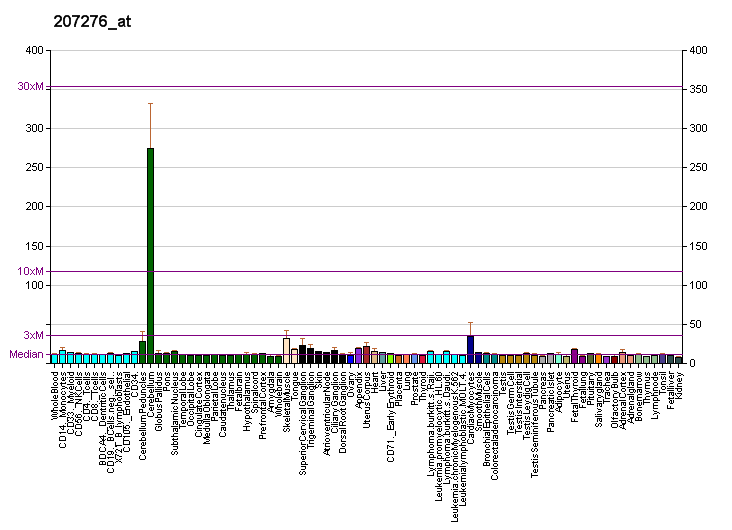
RNA expression pattern
Bgee	Human / Mouse (ortholog); Top expressed in: pons; cerebellar vermis; sural nerve; middle frontal gyrus; internal globus pallidus; inferior ganglion of vagus nerve; superior vestibular nucleus; frontal pole; Brodmann area 46; caudate nucleus / n/a; More reference expression data
BioGPS	More reference expression data
Orthologs
Species	Human	Mouse
Entrez	1038	n/a
Ensembl	n/a	n/a
UniProt	P51861	n/a
RefSeq (mRNA)	NM_004065	n/a
RefSeq (protein)	NP_004056	n/a
Location (UCSC)	n/a	n/a
PubMed search		n/a
- Wikidata
View/Edit Human

Cerebellar degeneration-related protein 1 is a protein that in humans is encoded by the CDR1 gene.

== See also ==
- Cerebellar degeneration-related protein 2
