= Citron kinase =

Enzyme found in humans

CIT

Identifiers
- Aliases: CIT, CRIK, STK21, citron rho-interacting serine/threonine kinase, MCPH17, CITK
- External IDs: OMIM: 605629; MGI: 105313; GeneCards: CIT
Enzyme activity
EC #	BRENDA	ExPASy	KEGG	MetaCyc
2.7.11.1	↗	↗	↗	↗

Gene location (Human)
Chr.	Chromosome 12 (human)
Band	12q24.23	Start	119,685,791 bp
Band	12q24.23	End	119,877,320 bp

Gene location (Mouse)
Chr.	Chromosome 5 (mouse)
Band	5|5 F	Start	115,983,337 bp
Band	5|5 F	End	116,147,006 bp
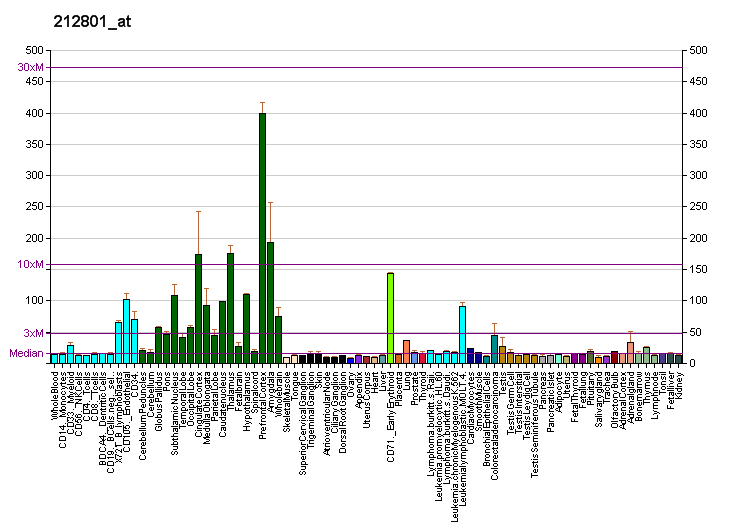

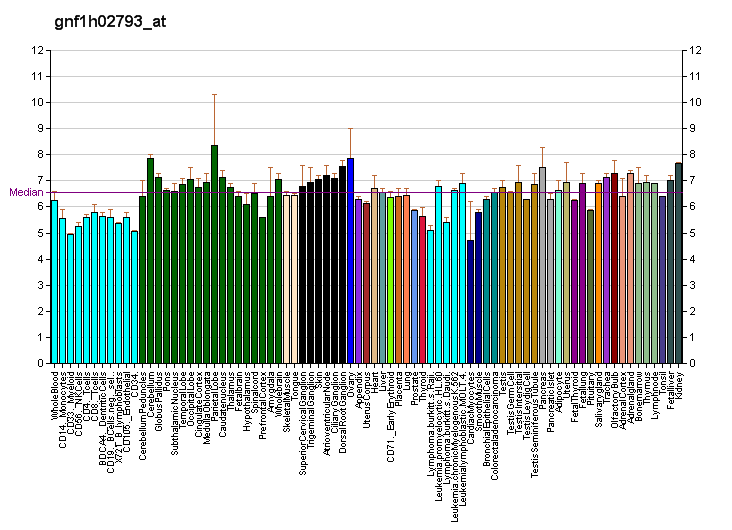
RNA expression pattern
Bgee	Human / Mouse (ortholog); Top expressed in: lateral nuclear group of thalamus; right frontal lobe; sural nerve; primary visual cortex; Brodmann area 9; caudate nucleus; putamen; postcentral gyrus; cingulate gyrus; anterior cingulate cortex / Top expressed in: medial dorsal nucleus; lateral geniculate nucleus; medial geniculate nucleus; basilar part of occipital bone; zygote; substantia nigra; secondary oocyte; lumbar subsegment of spinal cord; medial vestibular nucleus; rib; More reference expression data
BioGPS	More reference expression data
Gene ontology
Molecular function	transferase activity; nucleotide binding; protein kinase activity; PDZ domain binding; SH3 domain binding; scaffold protein binding; metal ion binding; kinase activity; protein serine/threonine kinase activity; protein binding; ATP binding
Cellular component	cytoplasm; cytosol; membrane; soma; plasma membrane; Golgi cisterna; cleavage furrow; midbody; nucleus; cytoskeleton; actin cytoskeleton; intracellular anatomical structure
Biological process	cell differentiation; intracellular signal transduction; phosphorylation; nervous system development; generation of neurons; positive regulation of cytokinesis; multicellular organism development; cell division; protein phosphorylation; cell cycle; G2/M transition of mitotic cell cycle; regulation of actin polymerization or depolymerization; Golgi organization; mitotic cytokinesis; neuron apoptotic process; mitotic cell cycle; liver development; peptidyl-threonine phosphorylation; cortical actin cytoskeleton organization; actomyosin structure organization
Sources:Amigo / QuickGO
Orthologs
Databases	NCBI: entry; OMA: entry
Species	Human	Mouse
Entrez	11113	12704
Ensembl	ENSG00000122966	ENSMUSG00000029516
UniProt	O14578	P49025
RefSeq (mRNA)	NM_001206999; NM_007174	NM_007708
RefSeq (protein)	NP_001193928; NP_009105	NP_031734
Location (UCSC)	Chr 12: 119.69 – 119.88 Mb	Chr 5: 115.98 – 116.15 Mb
PubMed search
- Wikidata
View/Edit Human	View/Edit Mouse

Citron Rho-interacting kinase is an enzyme that in humans is encoded by the CIT gene.

== Structure ==
Citron is a 183 kDa protein that contains a C6H2 zinc finger, a PH domain, and a long coiled-coil forming region including 4 leucine zippers and a rho / rac binding site. It was discovered as a rho/rac effector in 1995, interacting only with the GTP bound forms of rho and rac 1. Displaying a distinctive protein organization, this protein defines a separate class of rho partners. Using a cloning approach based on the polymerase chain reaction (PCR), a splice variant of citron, citron kinase (citron-K) has been identified with an alternative amino terminus. This N-terminal extension contains a protein kinase domain that has approximately 50% sequence identity to the sequences of ROCK, ROK, myotonic dystrophy protein kinase (MDPK) and the CDC42 effector known as MRCK or GEK. Citron kinase, which resembles the ROCK family of kinases and by comparison to it, is therefore a multiple domain protein containing an N-terminal kinase domain, an internal coiled-coil (CC) domain with Rho/Rac interacting site, and a C-terminal region consisting of a Zn finger, a pleckstrin homology (PH) domain, a Citron homology domain (CNH), a putative SH3 binding domain, and a PDZ-targeting motif. Its fly (Drosophila) ortholog is called Sticky. the importance of different domains of citron-K in its localization at different stages is discussed below.

== Tissue distribution, localization and dynamics ==
Investigating the tissue distribution of the citron isoforms with and without the kinase domain, it has been shown that the non-kinase form is restricted to the brain region while the kinase form is widely expressed. Immunofluorescence analyses determined the localization of citron-K and its behavior during cytokinesis. Citron-K first appeared at the equatorial cortex in anaphase, concentrated at the cleavage furrow in early telophase, accumulated in the middle of the intercellular bridge with full ingression of the cleavage furrow in mid telophase, and formed a ring-like structure in the midbody in late telophase, with negligible turnover rate at the midbody. In other words, the protein is much less dynamic at the midbody. Using a series of deletions, it was observed that distinct regions of Citron-K CC (coiled- coil) domain differentially regulate the localizations of Citron-K during cytokinesis. The C terminal part of the CC domain localized at the cleavage furrow and the midbody while the N-terminal part of the CC domain localized at the central spindle in early telophase and on outer region of the midbody in late telophase.

== Function ==
As previously mentioned, citron-K was believed to act in cytokinesis. Its depletion impairs maintenance of the midbody and its overexpression in HeLa cells rendered host cells multinucleated. Cytokinesis failure of Citron-K-depleted cells occurred after full ingression of the cleavage furrow, at the abscission stage. Microtubule disassembly was not seen in any of Citron-K depleted cells with cytokinesis failure. The dominant mode of failure was the inability of daughter cells, which are connected with a shorter intercellular bridge, to separate well. As the midbody microtubules were displaced from the center toward either of the two daughter cells, the two cells fused again with the microtubules absorbed into that daughter cell. To sum the process, Citron-K is important to keep proper structure of the midbody which holds the intercellular bridge microtubules between the two daughter cells and is thus required for successful transition from constriction to abscission. In molecular terms, citron-K depletion impaired the accumulation of 3 key proteins: Rho, Anillin and septins (specifically septin 6 and 7) in the intercellular bridge in mid–late telophase, which in previous stages early to mid-telophase was found to co-localize with them.

== Interactions ==
CIT (gene) has been shown to interact with RHOB and RHOA.

Citron-K or its fly orthologue Sticky has been suggested to interact with several molecules in cytokinesis such as Kinesin-3 (KIF14), actin, myosin light chain, and anillin.

=== KIF14 ===
The N- terminal of the coiled- coil domain of Citron-K directly interacts with the 2nd coiled-coil domain of KIF14. The localization of KIF14 and citron kinase to the central spindle and midbody is codependent, and they form a complex depending on the activation state of citron kinase. This suggests that the regulation of the interaction between KIF14 and Citron-K is important for Citron-K localization to exert its function but this interaction alone cannot accomplish cytokinesis fully.

=== ASPM ===
ASPM (abnormal spindle-like microcephaly associated) is localized to the spindle pole, and is essential for maintaining proliferative cell division. It has been reported that ASPM also localizes to the midbody ring in mammalian cells. This was due to the observed differential localization of the N-terminal and C-terminal regions of ASPM within mitotic cells to either spindle poles or to midbodies, respectively. Since, ASPM co-localizes with Citron-K at the midbody ring in HeLa cells and in developing neocortex, it has been proposed that ASPM may function to coordinate spindle rotation with localization of abscission through interaction with Citron-K.

=== Actomyosin filaments ===
In many organisms, the force that drives furrow ingression is the assembly and contraction of actomyosin filaments that often form a contractile ring. The contractile ring is a very dynamic structure in which actomyosin filaments are continuously assembled and disassembled. The small GTPase RhoA has been shown to be implicated, controlling CR assembly and dynamics during cytokinesis. This GTPase cycles between an inactive GDP-bound form and an active GTP-bound form, and this RhoA flux seems important for contractile ring dynamics. In drosophila, Sti (Sticky, ortholog of Citron-K) localizes to the cleavage furrow via association of a predicted coiled-coil region with actin and myosin. However, Sti depletion perturbs RhoA localization and causes excessive accumulation of phosphorylated MRLC (myosin regulatory light chain) at the cleavage site in late cytokinesis. Sti is believed to maintain correct RhoA localization at the cleavage site, which is in turn important for proper contractile ring organization at the end of cytokinesis.

=== Anillin ===
The scaffold protein anillin is one of the most crucial partners of RhoA during cytokinesis and plays a fundamental role in the assembly and stabilization of the contractile ring by interacting with RhoA, septins, F-actin, myosin II, and mDia2 and it has been shown that its depletion results in cleavage furrow instability. Citron-K is capable of physically and functionally interacting with the actin-binding protein anillin. Like active RhoA, anillin is also displaced from the midbody in Citron-K-depleted cells. The overexpression of Citron-K and of anillin leads to abscission delay. These results stress that Citron-K is a crucial abscission regulator that may promote midbody stability through active RhoA and anillin.

== Clinical implications ==
Citron-K is expressed during neurogenesis and plays important roles in neuronal progenitor cell division. Recessive mutations in Citron-K cause severe microcephaly both in rats and mice. In humans and rodents, loss of Citron-K expression results in defects in neurogenic cytokinesis. Similarly in Drosophila, RNAi knockdown of Citron-K results in a failure of cellular abscission. CIT is associated with microlissencephaly.

== Formation of extracellular vesicles ==
During HIV-1 viral release in human cell lines, in addition to increasing viral production and release, citron kinase (a RhoA effector) enhanced the release of vesicles bearing HSC70, CD82, and LAMP1, suggesting that citron kinase is involved in the exocytosis of late endosomal compartments.
