= Centralspindlin =

Centralspindlin is a motor complex implicated in cell division. It contributes to virtually every step in cytokinesis, It is highly conserved in animal cells as a component of the spindle midzone and midbody. Centralspindlin is required for the assembly of the mitotic spindle as well as for microtubule bundling and anchoring of midbody microtubules to the plasma membrane. This complex is also implicated in tethering the spindle apparatus to the plasma membrane during cytokinesis This interaction permits cleavage furrow ingression. In addition, centralspindlin's interaction with the ESCRT III allows for abscission to occur.

== Structure ==
Centralspindlin is a heterotetramer consisting of two different subunit proteins:

1. A KIF23 dimer (Kinesin 6 motor protein, also known as MKLP1 in mammals and ZEN-4 in C. elegans)

Consists of a motor domain linked to a parallel coiled coil and a globular region by a linker

1. A RACGAP1 dimer (Also known as MgcRacGAP in mammals or CYK-4 in C. elegans)

Contains a coiled-coil and an important RhoGAP domain

Both KIF23 and RacGAP1 dimerize via their parallel coiled coil domain. Centralspindlin oligomerizes in order to link the mitotic spindle with the plasma membrane The sequences mediating interactions between KIF23 and RacGAP1 are highly variable between species. However, a high affinity interaction between these subunits is essential for the proper functioning of the Centralspindlin complex.

=== Subunits ===
KIF23 interacts with microtubules at sites of overlap, linking the centralspindlin complex to the mitotic spindle. RacGAP1 recruits ECT2 to the central spindle. ECT2 is a Guanine nucleotide-exchange factor for RhoA. Cytokinesis is initiated when RhoA is activated by ECT2. RacGAP1 is also involved in tethering the central spindle to the plasma membrane. Without this interaction, cytokinesis cannot occur.

== Interactions ==
- A glance at the busy complex
- Interacts with RhoA and Rac during furrow ingression
- Recruits cytokinetic effector proteins such as ECT2
- Binds microtubule plus-end overlaps characteristic of the central spindle through its KIF23 subunit
- Recruits the ESCRT III complex in late cytokinesis
- Promotes cortical accumulation of F-actin and myosin through its RACGAP1 subunit
- Stabilized through interactions with Aurora B kinase
- Negatively regulated by 14-3-3
- RacGAP1 binds to PRC1 microtubule crosslinker, an interaction that is crucial for maintaining the stability of the spindle midzone.
