= RACGAP1 =

Protein-coding gene in the species Homo sapiens

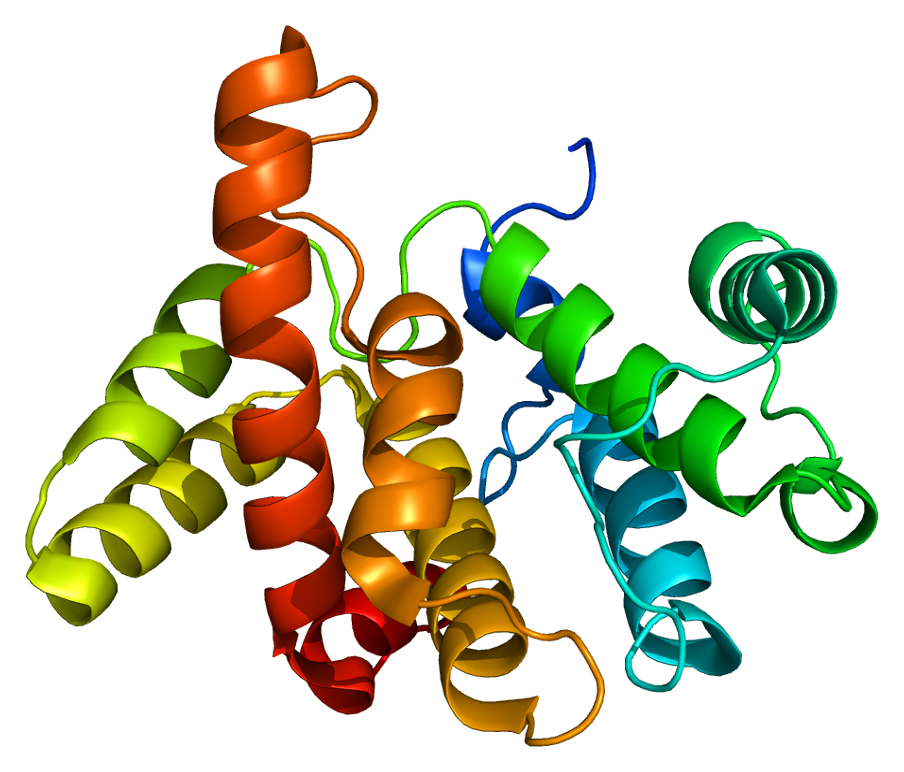

Identifiers
- Aliases: RACGAP1, CYK4, HsCYK-4, ID-GAP, MgcRacGAP, Rac GTPase activating protein 1, CDAN3B
- External IDs: OMIM: 604980; MGI: 1349423; GeneCards: RACGAP1
Available structures
PDB	Ortholog search: PDBe RCSB
PDB	List of PDB id codes 2OVJ, 3W6R, 3WPQ, 3WPS, 4B6D, 5C2J, 5C2K

Gene location (Human)
Chr.	Chromosome 12 (human)
Band	12q13.12	Start	49,976,923 bp
Band	12q13.12	End	50,033,136 bp

Gene location (Mouse)
Chr.	Chromosome 15 (mouse)
Band	15|15 F1	Start	99,518,377 bp
Band	15|15 F1	End	99,549,537 bp
RNA expression pattern
Bgee	Human / Mouse (ortholog); Top expressed in: ventricular zone; ganglionic eminence; trabecular bone; sperm; secondary oocyte; oral cavity; bone marrow; amniotic fluid; gonad; right testis / Top expressed in: ventricular zone; spermatocyte; spermatid; endocardial cushion; yolk sac; dermis; atrioventricular valve; atrium; thymus; ganglionic eminence; More reference expression data
BioGPS	n/a
Gene ontology
Molecular function	microtubule binding; alpha-tubulin binding; metal ion binding; protein binding; beta-tubulin binding; gamma-tubulin binding; protein kinase binding; phosphatidylinositol-3,4,5-trisphosphate binding; lipid binding; GTPase activator activity
Cellular component	cytoplasm; cytosol; centralspindlin complex; membrane; extrinsic component of cytoplasmic side of plasma membrane; plasma membrane; spindle; nucleoplasm; acrosomal vesicle; spindle midzone; cleavage furrow; mitotic spindle; microtubule; extracellular exosome; cytoskeleton; nucleus; cytoplasmic vesicle; midbody; Flemming body
Biological process	cell differentiation; intracellular signal transduction; antigen processing and presentation of exogenous peptide antigen via MHC class II; mitotic spindle midzone assembly; sulfate transport; mitotic cytokinesis; ion transport; cell division; positive regulation of cytokinesis; multicellular organism development; microtubule-based movement; actomyosin contractile ring assembly; spermatogenesis; neuroblast proliferation; cell cycle; regulation of attachment of spindle microtubules to kinetochore; regulation of small GTPase mediated signal transduction; signal transduction; positive regulation of GTPase activity; retrograde vesicle-mediated transport, Golgi to endoplasmic reticulum; regulation of embryonic development; transport
Sources:Amigo / QuickGO
Orthologs
Databases	NCBI: entry; OMA: entry
Species	Human	Mouse
Entrez	29127	26934
Ensembl	ENSG00000161800	ENSMUSG00000023015
UniProt	Q9H0H5	Q9WVM1
RefSeq (mRNA)	NM_001126103; NM_001126104; NM_013277; NM_001319999; NM_001320000 NM_001320001; NM_001320002; NM_001320003; NM_001320004; NM_001320005; NM_001320006; NM_001320007	NM_001253808; NM_001253809; NM_012025
RefSeq (protein)	NP_001119575; NP_001119576; NP_001306928; NP_001306929; NP_001306930 NP_001306931; NP_001306932; NP_001306933; NP_001306934; NP_001306935; NP_001306936; NP_037409	NP_001240737; NP_001240738; NP_036155
Location (UCSC)	Chr 12: 49.98 – 50.03 Mb	Chr 15: 99.52 – 99.55 Mb
PubMed search
- Wikidata
View/Edit Human	View/Edit Mouse

Rac GTPase-activating protein 1 is an enzyme that in humans is encoded by the RACGAP1 gene.

== Function ==
Rho GTPases control a variety of cellular processes. There are 3 subtypes of Rho GTPases in the Ras superfamily of small G proteins: RHO (see MIM 165370), RAC (see RAC1; MIM 602048), and CDC42 (MIM 116952). GTPase-activating proteins (GAPs) bind activated forms of Rho GTPases and stimulate GTP hydrolysis. Through this catalytic function, Rho GAPs negatively regulate Rho-mediated signals. GAPs may also serve as effector molecules and play a role in signaling downstream of Rho and other Ras-like GTPases.[supplied by OMIM].

== Clinical significance ==
Over-expression of RACGAP1 is observed in multiple human cancers including breast cancer, gastric cancer and colorectal cancer. Evidence show that RACGAP1 can modulate mitochondrial quality control by stimulating mitophagy and mitochondrial biogenesis in breast cancer. Knocking out RACGAP1 in vitro using CRISPR/Cas9 leads to cytokinesis failure.

== Interactions ==
RACGAP1 has been shown to interact with ECT2, Rnd2 and SLC26A8.

During cytokinesis, RACGAP1 has been shown to interact with KIF23 to form the centralspindlin complex. This complex is essential for the formation of the central spindle. RACGAP1 also interacts with PRC1 to stabilize and maintain the central spindle as anaphase proceeds. RACGAP1 can also interact with ECT2 during anaphase of cytokinesis, loss of RACGAP1 leads to cytokinesis failure.
