= ANLN =

Mammalian protein found in Homo sapiens

Identifiers
- Aliases: ANLN, Scraps, scra, FSGS8, anillin actin binding protein, anillin, actin binding protein
- External IDs: OMIM: 616027; MGI: 1920174; GeneCards: ANLN
Available structures
PDB	Ortholog search: PDBe RCSB
PDB	List of PDB id codes 2Y7B, 4XH3, 4XOI

Gene location (Human)
Chr.	Chromosome 7 (human)
Band	7p14.2	Start	36,389,821 bp
Band	7p14.2	End	36,453,791 bp

Gene location (Mouse)
Chr.	Chromosome 9 (mouse)
Band	9|9 A3	Start	22,243,308 bp
Band	9|9 A3	End	22,300,484 bp
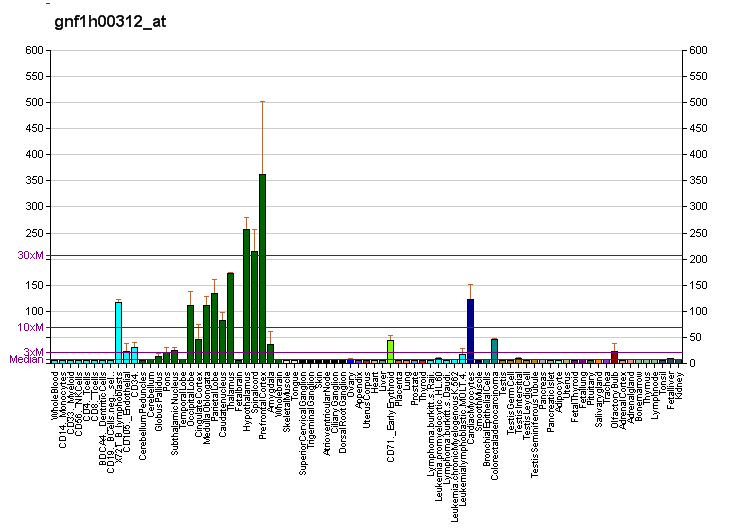
RNA expression pattern
Bgee	Human / Mouse (ortholog); Top expressed in: corpus callosum; inferior ganglion of vagus nerve; C1 segment; pars reticulata; subthalamic nucleus; medulla oblongata; internal globus pallidus; superior vestibular nucleus; pars compacta; pons / Top expressed in: deep cerebellar nuclei; endothelial cell of lymphatic vessel; pontine nuclei; vas deferens; dermis; secondary oocyte; efferent ductule; zygote; genital tubercle; abdominal wall; More reference expression data
BioGPS	More reference expression data
Gene ontology
Molecular function	actin binding; protein binding; cadherin binding
Cellular component	cytoplasm; cell cortex; actomyosin contractile ring; cytoskeleton; nucleus; nucleoplasm; actin cytoskeleton; cell cortex region; bleb; cell projection; midbody
Biological process	cell division; septin ring assembly; glomerular visceral epithelial cell migration; mitotic cytokinesis; cell cycle; regulation of exit from mitosis; hematopoietic progenitor cell differentiation; positive regulation of bleb assembly; actomyosin contractile ring assembly; cortical cytoskeleton organization; septin ring organization; protein localization to mitotic actomyosin contractile ring
Sources:Amigo / QuickGO
Orthologs
Databases	NCBI: entry; OMA: entry
Species	Human	Mouse
Entrez	54443	68743
Ensembl	ENSG00000011426	ENSMUSG00000036777
UniProt	Q9NQW6	Q8K298
RefSeq (mRNA)	NM_001284301; NM_001284302; NM_018685	NM_028390
RefSeq (protein)	NP_001271230; NP_001271231; NP_061155	NP_082666; NP_001391862
Location (UCSC)	Chr 7: 36.39 – 36.45 Mb	Chr 9: 22.24 – 22.3 Mb
PubMed search
- Wikidata
View/Edit Human	View/Edit Mouse

Anillin is a conserved protein implicated in cytoskeletal dynamics during cellularization and cytokinesis. The ANLN gene in humans and the scraps gene in Drosophila encode Anillin. In 1989, anillin was first isolated in embryos of Drosophila melanogaster. It was identified as an F-actin binding protein. Six years later, the anillin gene was cloned from cDNA originating from a Drosophila ovary. Staining with anti-anillin (Antigen 8) antibody showed the anillin localizes to the nucleus during interphase and to the contractile ring during cytokinesis. These observations agree with further research that found anillin in high concentrations near the cleavage furrow coinciding with RhoA, a key regulator of contractile ring formation.

The name of the protein anillin originates from a Spanish word, anillo. Anillo means ring and shows that the name anillin references the observed enrichment of anillins at the contractile ring during cytokinesis. Anillins are also enriched at other actomyosin rings, most significantly, those at the leading edge of the Drosophila embryo during cellularization. These actomyosin rings invaginate to separate all nuclei for one another in the syncytial blastoderm.

== Structure ==
Anillin has a unique multi-domain structure. At the N-terminus, there is an actin- and myosin-binding domain. At the C-terminus, there is a PH domain. The PH domain is conserved and essential for anillin functionality. The human anillin cDNA, located on Chr7, encodes a 1,125–amino acid protein with a predicted molecular mass of 124 kD and a pI of 8.1. The mouse anillin gene is located on Chromosome 9.

There are also numerous anillin-like protein homologues found outside of metazoans. In Schizosaccharomyces pombe (fission yeast), there are Mid1p and Mid2p. These two anillin-like proteins do not have any overlap in their functions. Mid1p has been characterized as a key regulator in cytokinesis, responsible for arranging contractile ring assembly and positioning. Mid2p acts later in cytokinesis to organize septins during septation, or the invagination of inner membranes, outer membranes, and the cell wall that occurs in order to separate daughter cells completely. Saccharomyces cerevisiae (budding yeast) also have two anillin-like proteins, Boi1p and Boi2p. Boi1p and Boi2p localize to the nucleus and contractile ring at the bud neck, respectively. They are essential for cell growth and bud formation.

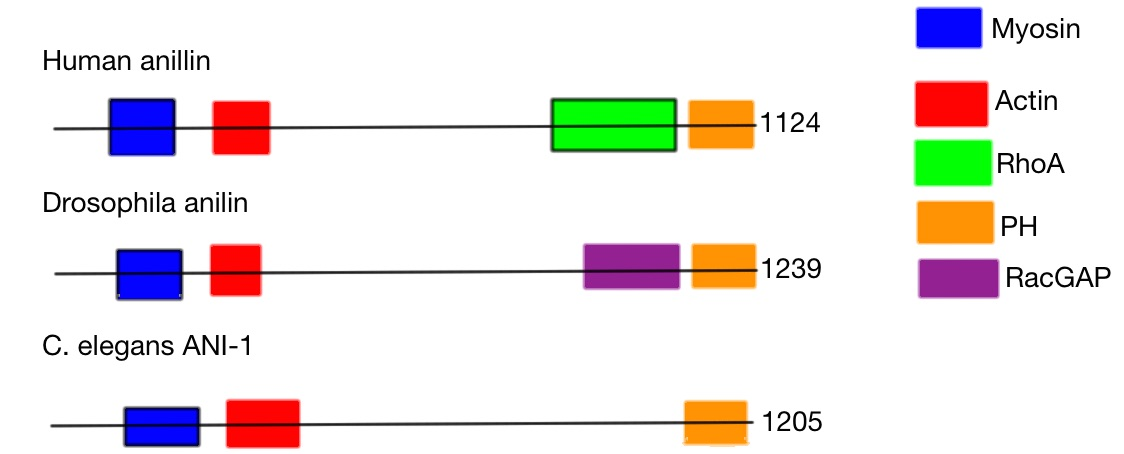
The domains found in anillin across species

== Function ==
Anillins are required for the faithfulness of cytokinesis and its F-actin-, myosin-, and septin-binding domains implicate anillin in actomyosin cytoskeletal organization. In agreement with this belief, anillin-mutant cells have disrupted contractile rings. Additionally, it is hypothesized that anillin couples the actomyosin cytoskeleton to microtubules by binding MgcRacGAP/CYK-4/RacGAP50C.

Anillins have also been shown to organize the actomyosin cytoskeleton into syncytial structures observed in Drosophila embryos or C. elegans gonads. ANI-1 and ANI-2 (proteins homologous to anillin) are essential for embryonic viability in both organisms. ANI-1 is required for cortical ruffling, pseudocleavage, and all contractile events that occur in embryos prior to mitosis. ANI-1 is also crucial for segregation of polar bodies during meiosis. ANI-2 functions in the maintenance of the structure of the central core of the cytoplasm, the rachis, during oogenesis. ANI-2 ensures oocytes do not disconnect prematurely from the rachis, thereby leading to the generation of embryos of varying sizes.

In vitro experiments suggest that anillin drives myosin-independent actin contractility.

== Binding Partners ==
=== Actin ===
Anillin specifically binds F-actin, rather than G-actin. Binding of F-actin by anillin only occurs during cell division. Anillin also bundles actin filaments together and drives their relative sliding. This contractile behavior is independent of myosin and ATP and may couple with actin filament disassembly. Amino acids 258-340 are sufficient and necessary for F-actin binding in Drosophila, but amino acids 246-371 are necessary to bundle actin filaments. The ability of anillin to bind to and bundle actin together is conserved through many species. It is hypothesized that by regulating actin bundling, anillin increases the efficiency of actomyosin contractility during cell division. Both anillin and F-actin are found in contractile structures. They are recruited independently to the contractile ring, but F-actin increases the efficiency of anillin targeting. Anillin may also be involved in promoting the polymerization of F-actin by stabilizing formin mDia2 in an active form.

=== Myosin ===
Anillin interacts directly with non-muscle myosin II and interacts indirectly with myosin via F-actin. Residues 142-254 (near the N-terminus) are essential for anillin binding myosin in Xenopus. The interaction of anillin and myosin is also dependent on phosphorylation of the myosin light chain. The interaction of myosin and anillin does not seem to serve in recruitment, but rather organization of myosin. In Drosophila, anillin is necessary to organize myosin into rings in the cellularization front. Depletion of anillin in Drosophila and humans leads to changes in the spatial and temporal stability of myosin during cytokinesis. In C. elegans, ANI-1 organizes myosin into foci during cytokinesis and establishment of polarity, whereas, ANI-2 is a requirement for the maintenance of myosin-rich contractile lining of oogenic gonads.

=== Septins ===
Septin localization during cytokinesis and cellularization is dependent on its association with anillin. The direct interaction between anillin and septins was first shown by the interaction seen between Xenopus anillin and a minimal reconstituted heterooligomer of human septins 2, 6, and 7. The ability of anillin to bind to septins is dependent on the C-terminal domain, which contains a terminal PH domain and an upstream sequence known as the “Anillin Homology” (AH) domain.

=== Rho ===
The AH domain of human anillin is essential for its interaction with RhoA. Depletion of RhoA halts contractile ring assembly and ingression, whereas, anillin depletion leads to a less severe phenotype when the contractile ring forms and ingresses partially. Depletion of anillin in Drosophila spermatocytes greatly reduces the localization of Rho and F-actin to equatorial regions.

=== Ect2 ===
Anillin interacts with Ect2, further supporting the idea that anillin stabilizes RhoA localization since Ect2 is an activator of RhoA. Independent of RhoA, the interaction between anillin and Ect2 occurs. This interaction is essential of the GEF activity of Ect2 and requires the AH domain of anillin and the PH domain of Ect2.

=== Cyk-4 ===
Drosophila anillin interacts with Cyk-4, a central spindle protein, indicating that anillin may have a role in determining the division plane during cytokinesis. In anillin-depleted larval cells, the central spindle does not extend to the cortex. Human anillin-depleted cells show improperly positioned and distorted central spindles.

=== Microtubules ===
Anillin was first isolated from Drosophila by harnessing its interactions with both F-actin and microtubules. Furthermore, anillin-rich structures that form after Latrunculin A treatment of Drosophila cells localize to the plus-ends of microtubules. The interaction between anillin and microtubules suggest that anillin may serve as a signaling factor to relay the position of the mitotic spindle to the cortex to ensure appropriate contractile ring formation during cytokinesis.

== Regulation ==
Anillins in metazoans are heavily phosphorylated; however, the kinases responsible for the phosphorylation are unknown at the present time. In humans and Drosophila, anillins are recruited to the equatorial cortex in a RhoA-dependent manner. This recruitment is independent of other cytoskeletal Rho targets such as myosin, F-actin, and Rho-kinase. It has been observed that anillin proteolysis is triggered after mitotic exit by the Anaphase Promoting Complex (APC).

Most anillins can be sequestered to the nucleus during interphase, but there are exceptions – Drosophila anilins in the early embryo, C. elegans ANI-1 in early embryos, C. elegans ANI-2 in oogenic gonads, and Mid2p in fission yeast. These anillins that are not sequestered during interphase suggest that anillins may also regulate cytoskeletal dynamics outside the contractile ring during cytokinesis.

== Role in Diseases ==
Anillin is critical for cell division and therefore development and homeostasis in metazoans. In recent years, the expression levels of anillin have been shown to correlate to the metastatic potential of human tumours. In colorectal cancer, expression levels of anillin are higher in tumours and when anillin was over-expressed in HT29 cells, a classical colorectal cancer cell line, the cells showed faster replication kinetics due to the lengthening of G2/M phase. Increasing the expression of anillin also led to further invasiveness and migration of numerous colorectal cancer cell lines. The hypothesis from such observations is that anillin promotes EMT and cell migration through cytoskeletal remodeling, leading to enhanced proliferation, invasion, and mobility of tumour cells.
