= Testis-expressed protein 14 =

Human protein encoded by TEX14 gene

TEX14

Identifiers
- Aliases: TEX14, CT113, testis expressed 14, intercellular bridge forming factor, SPGF23
- External IDs: OMIM: 605792; MGI: 1933227; GeneCards: TEX14
Available structures
PDB	Ortholog search: PDBe RCSB
PDB	List of PDB id codes 3WUT, 3WUU

Gene location (Human)
Chr.	Chromosome 17 (human)
Band	17q22	Start	58,556,678 bp
Band	17q22	End	58,692,055 bp

Gene location (Mouse)
Chr.	Chromosome 11 (mouse)
Band	11|11 C	Start	87,295,891 bp
Band	11|11 C	End	87,446,649 bp
RNA expression pattern
Bgee	Human / Mouse (ortholog); Top expressed in: right testis; left testis; gonad; oocyte; secondary oocyte; testicle; sperm; cerebellar cortex; cerebellar hemisphere; right hemisphere of cerebellum / Top expressed in: spermatocyte; spermatid; seminiferous tubule; zygote; Gonadal ridge; secondary oocyte; ovary; primary oocyte; cumulus cell; morula; More reference expression data
BioGPS	n/a
Gene ontology
Molecular function	protein binding; nucleotide binding; protein kinase binding; protein kinase activity; ATP binding
Cellular component	cytoplasm; chromosome; chromosome, centromeric region; extracellular exosome; intercellular bridge; midbody; kinetochore
Biological process	cell cycle; negative regulation of cytokinesis; cell division; protein phosphorylation; negative regulation of protein binding; mitotic spindle assembly checkpoint signaling; male meiotic nuclear division; intercellular bridge organization; attachment of spindle microtubules to kinetochore; mitotic sister chromatid separation; cellular response to leukemia inhibitory factor
Sources:Amigo / QuickGO
Orthologs
Databases	NCBI: entry; OMA: entry
Species	Human	Mouse
Entrez	56155	83560
Ensembl	ENSG00000121101	ENSMUSG00000010342
UniProt	Q8IWB6	Q7M6U3
RefSeq (mRNA)	NM_001201457; NM_031272; NM_198393	NM_001199293; NM_031386
RefSeq (protein)	NP_001188386; NP_112562; NP_938207	NP_001186222; NP_113563
Location (UCSC)	Chr 17: 58.56 – 58.69 Mb	Chr 11: 87.3 – 87.45 Mb
PubMed search
- Wikidata
View/Edit Human	View/Edit Mouse

Testis-expressed protein 14 is a protein in humans encoded by the TEX14 gene, and is 1497 amino acids in length. TEX14 plays a vital role in the formation of germ cells, as it is an essential component of the mammalian germ cell interphase bridge.

An orthologue of TEX14 exists in other mammals, also called TEX14.

== Function ==
During cell division, specifically in telophase, the spindle is converted into a midbody. This midbody contains a ring of TEX14, which gradually travels outwards as cell division progresses. Finally, TEX14 marks the ends of the intercellular bridge.

== Clinical significance ==
Male mice and male pigs that lack normal TEX14 are incapable of producing functional sperm, and thus are infertile. However, TEX14-knockout female mice are not infertile.
