= Midbody =

Midbody may refer to:

- The middle part of the body of an animal in zoology
- Midbody (cell biology), a transient organelle formed after mammalian cell division
