= Contact guidance =

Contact guidance refers to a phenomenon for which the orientation of cells and stress fibers is influenced by geometrical patterns such as nano/microgrooves on substrates, or collagen fibers in gels and soft tissues. This phenomenon was discovered in 1912, and the terminology was introduced in 1945, but it is with the development of tissue engineering that researchers drew increasing attention on this topic, seeing the potential of contact guidance in influencing the morphology and organization of cells. Nevertheless, the biological processes underlying contact guidance are still unclear.

== Contact guidance on two-dimensional substrates ==
When cells are seeded onto flat substrates, they are normally in a random orientation. However, substrates with topographical patterns influence the orientation of cells cultured on these surfaces by their geometrical cues. For example, if a substrate has nano/microgrooves running parallel to each other, cells orient along the direction of these nano/microgrooves. Based on this, cells seem to be able to sense the structural characteristics of their surrounding and consequently respond by adopting the orientation of topographical stimuli. A similar effect can be obtained when cells are cultured on flat surfaces with lines of proteins printed on top (to which cells can adhere), interspersed by repellent lines; in that case, cells also align along the patterns.

It has also been observed that the phenomenon of contact guidance on microgrooved surfaces is influenced by the groove width. For instance, osteoblast-like cells align along the nanogrooves only for grooves wider than 75 nm. A similar behavior has been observed with other cell types, such as fibroblasts, which align along these topographical patterns when the grooves are wider than 150 nm. On the other hand, grooves that are too wide can decrease the effects of contact guidance

== Contact guidance in three-dimensional structures ==
Cells can orient in response to contact guidance when located inside three-dimensional structures, such as collagen gels, scaffolds, and soft tissues. In those conditions, the geometrical cues provided by collagen or scaffold fibers are able to influence the orientation of cells. For example, it has been observed that endothelial colony forming cells align along the direction of the fibers present in electrospun scaffolds. Similarly, the collagen fibers present in collagen gels and soft tissues can influence cell alignment, providing the most important stimulus in terms of cell orientation

== Potential of contact guidance for tissue engineering ==
Recent research has highlighted the importance of cellular alignment for the mechanical properties and functionality of the prostheses developed using the principles of tissue engineering. Currently, scientists are investigating the mechanisms and potential of contact guidance to control cellular alignment, which would ultimately lead to the control of their cellular forces and certain aspects of collagen remodeling.

== Biological mechanisms determining contact guidance ==
Many researchers have formulated hypotheses on the biological mechanisms determining contact guidance. In general, cellular contraction, stress fibers and focal adhesions seem to play an important role. Recently, a computational model has been developed that is able to simulate the re-alignment of cells and stress fibers on top of grooved surfaces. Briefly, it has been supposed that cells, once seeded, form focal adhesions on top of the ridges and not above the grooves.

Once formed, the focal adhesions produce a signal that starts to diffuse into the cell inducing stress fiber assembly. At this point, there are two different possibilities, depending on the groove size. On the one hand, when the groove size is small, the intracellular signal produced by focal adhesions on the ridges can homogenously reach all locations in the cell. In that case, the stress fiber assembly is isotropic, and these fibers can pull on their surroundings in an isotropic fashion, and consequently the resulting cell shape is isotropic (without a preferred alignment).

On the other hand, when the groove size is relatively large, the intracellular signal cannot reach the locations of the cell situated on top of the grooves, as diffusion is limited. As a result, stress fibers form only close to the ridges, and these acto-myosin bundles pull on their surroundings anisotropically. Due to the anisotropic cellular contraction, stress fibers and cells align along the direction of the microgrooves. Further experiments are necessary to validate this theory.
