= KIF23 =

Protein-coding gene in the species Homo sapiens

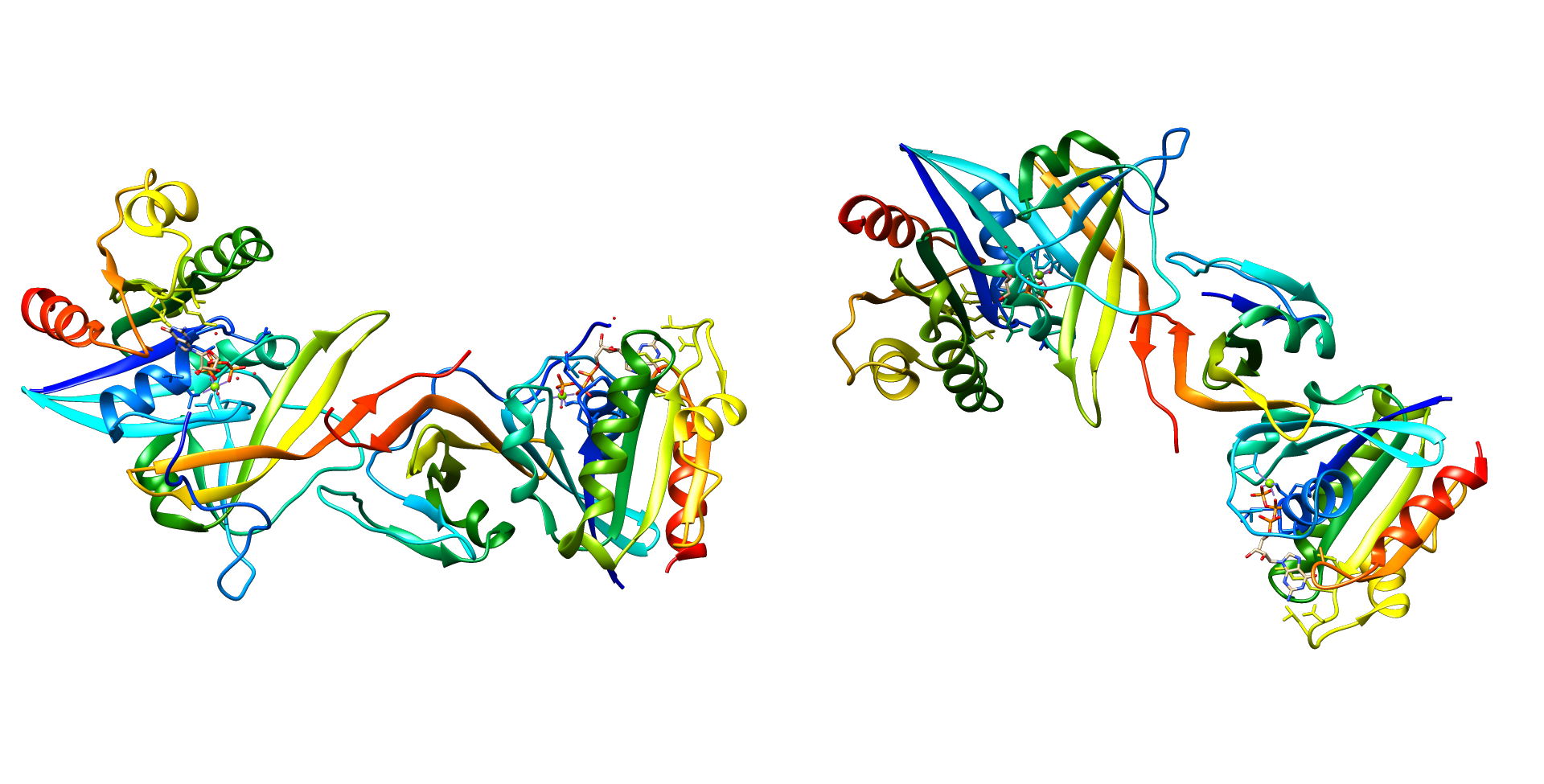

Identifiers
- Aliases: KIF23, CHO1, KNSL5, MKLP-1, MKLP1, kinesin family member 23, CDAN3A
- External IDs: OMIM: 605064; MGI: 1919069; GeneCards: KIF23
Available structures
PDB	Ortholog search: PDBe RCSB
PDB	List of PDB id codes 3VHX

Gene location (Human)
Chr.	Chromosome 15 (human)
Band	15q23	Start	69,414,246 bp
Band	15q23	End	69,448,427 bp

Gene location (Mouse)
Chr.	Chromosome 9 (mouse)
Band	9|9 B	Start	61,823,187 bp
Band	9|9 B	End	61,854,056 bp
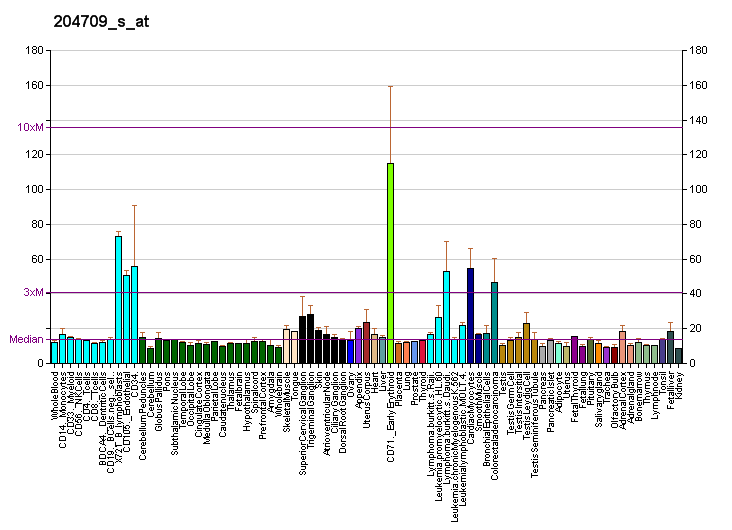
RNA expression pattern
Bgee	Human / Mouse (ortholog); Top expressed in: ventricular zone; secondary oocyte; ganglionic eminence; gonad; testicle; stromal cell of endometrium; bone marrow; mucosa of transverse colon; trabecular bone; left testis / Top expressed in: zygote; secondary oocyte; tail of embryo; genital tubercle; primary oocyte; Ileal epithelium; ventricular zone; morula; morula; maxillary prominence; More reference expression data
BioGPS	More reference expression data
Gene ontology
Molecular function	nucleotide binding; microtubule binding; ATPase activity; protein binding; ATP binding; microtubule motor activity
Cellular component	cytoplasm; cytosol; centrosome; centralspindlin complex; kinesin complex; focal adhesion; spindle; nucleoplasm; intercellular bridge; mitotic spindle; microtubule; cytoskeleton; nucleus; midbody; Flemming body
Biological process	plus-end-directed vesicle transport along microtubule; antigen processing and presentation of exogenous peptide antigen via MHC class II; mitotic spindle midzone assembly; mitotic cytokinesis; cell division; positive regulation of cytokinesis; microtubule-based movement; actomyosin contractile ring assembly; cell cycle; mitotic spindle elongation; retrograde vesicle-mediated transport, Golgi to endoplasmic reticulum; cytokinesis
Sources:Amigo / QuickGO
Orthologs
Databases	NCBI: entry; OMA: entry
Species	Human	Mouse
Entrez	9493	71819
Ensembl	ENSG00000137807	ENSMUSG00000032254
UniProt	Q02241	E9Q5G3
RefSeq (mRNA)	NM_001281301; NM_004856; NM_138555; NM_001367804; NM_001367805	NM_024245
RefSeq (protein)	NP_001268230; NP_004847; NP_612565; NP_001354733; NP_001354734	NP_077207; NP_001391984; NP_001391985; NP_001391986
Location (UCSC)	Chr 15: 69.41 – 69.45 Mb	Chr 9: 61.82 – 61.85 Mb
PubMed search
- Wikidata
View/Edit Human	View/Edit Mouse

Kinesin-like protein KIF23 is a protein that in humans is encoded by the KIF23 gene.

== Gene ==
The human KIF23 gene is located on chromosome 15 at band q23 and spans 25 exons. It encodes a member of the kinesin family of motor proteins, which are essential for processes such as cytokinesis. The KIF23 gene undergoes alternative splicing, resulting in at least two transcript variants that produce different protein isoforms, most notably the larger CHO1 and the smaller MKLP1.

== Structure ==
KIF23 is a member of the kinesin superfamily of microtubule-dependent motor proteins. Structurally, KIF23 consists of several distinct domains: a conserved N-terminal kinesin motor domain responsible for ATP hydrolysis and microtubule binding, a central coiled-coil region that mediates dimerization and interaction with partner proteins, and a C-terminal tail domain, which includes the Arf6-interacting domain important for regulatory functions. The protein exists as part of a heterotetrameric complex called centralspindlin, composed of two KIF23 molecules and two RACGAP1 molecules. This complex localizes to the central spindle during anaphase and the midbody during cytokinesis, where it orchestrates the assembly of the contractile ring and abscission machinery necessary for cell division. KIF23 is subject to alternative splicing, resulting in at least two isoforms: the larger CHO1 and the smaller MKLP1. The protein’s structure enables it to cross-bridge antiparallel microtubules and facilitate their movement, a function essential for both mitotic spindle organization and successful cytokinesis.

== Function ==
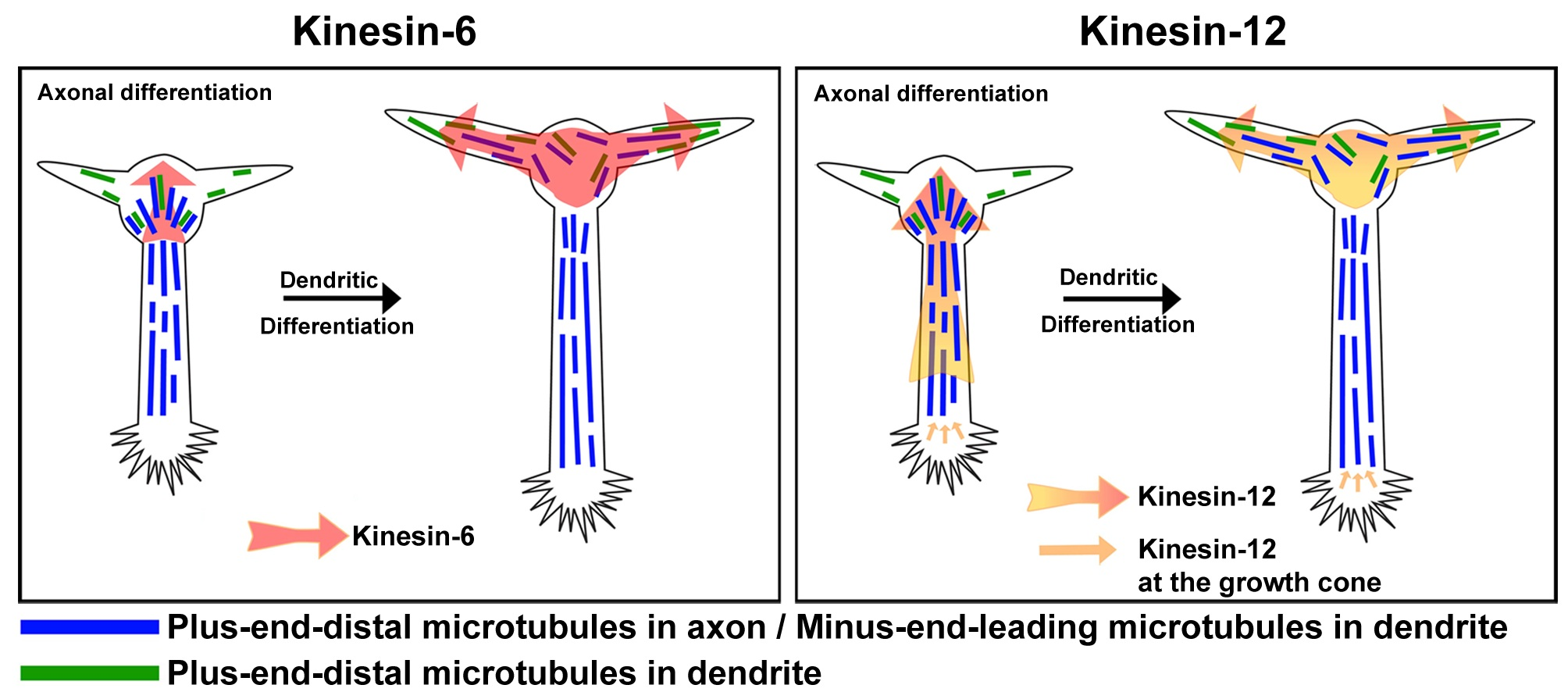
Model for co-regulation of microtubule polarity in axons and dendrites by different mitotic kinesins. During axonal differentiation, forces generated by cytoplasmic dynein drive plus-end-distal microtubules into the axon and nascent dendrites (not shown). (A) Forces generated by kinesin-6 at the cell body oppose the forces generated by cytoplasmic dynein, restricting the transport of plus-end-distal microtubules into the axon. As the neuron matures, kinesin-6 fuels the transport of short microtubules with their minus-end distal into all of the processes except the one designated to remain the axon, thus causing the other processes to differentiate into dendrites. (B) Forces generated by kinesin-12 behave similarly to kinesin-6 with regard to introducing minus-end-distal microtubules into the dendrite, but kinesin-12 is also present in the axon and growth cone, pushing plus-end-distal microtubules back toward the cell body. As a result, kinesin-12 behaves like kinesin-6 with regard to dendrites but produces effects more like kinesin-5 with regard to the axon.

=== In cell division ===
KIF23 (also known as kinesin-6, CHO1/MKLP1, C. elegans ZEN-4, and Drosophila pavarotti) is a member of kinesin-like protein family. This family includes microtubule-dependent molecular motors that transport organelles within cells and move chromosomes during cell division. This protein has been shown to cross-bridge antiparallel microtubules and drive microtubule movement in vitro. Alternate splicing of this gene results in two transcript variants encoding two different isoforms, better known as CHO1, the larger isoform and MKLP1, the smaller isoform. KIF23 is a plus-end directed motor protein expressed in mitosis, involved in the formation of the cleavage furrow in late anaphase and in cytokinesis. KIF23 is part of the centralspindlin complex that includes PRC1, Aurora B and 14-3-3 which cluster together at the spindle midzone to enable anaphase in dividing cells.

=== In neurons ===
In neuronal development KIF23 is involved in the transport of minus-end distal microtubules into dendrites and is expressed exclusively in cell bodies and dendrites. Knockdown of KIF23 by antisense oligonucleotides and by siRNA both cause a significant increase in axon length and a decrease in dendritic phenotype in neuroblastoma cells and in rat neurons. In differentiating neurons, KIF23 restricts the movement of short microtubules into axons by acting as a "brake" against the driving forces of cytoplasmic dynein. As neurons mature, KIF23 drives minus-end distal microtubules into nascent dendrites contributing to the multi-polar orientation of dendritic microtubules and the formation of their short, fat, tapering morphology.

== Clinical significance ==
Mutations in KIF23 have been associated with Congenital dyserythropoietic anemia type III, highlighting its importance in normal cell function and development.

KIF23 has also been implicated in the formation and proliferation of GL261 gliomas in mouse.

== Interactions ==
KIF23 has been shown to interact with:

- ARF3,
- AURKB,
- BIRC6, and
- PRC1.
