= Midbody (cell biology) =

Transient structure existing during the end of cytokinesis

The midbody is a transient structure found in mammalian cells and is present near the end of cytokinesis just prior to the complete separation of the dividing cells. The structure was first described by Walther Flemming in 1891.

== Structure ==
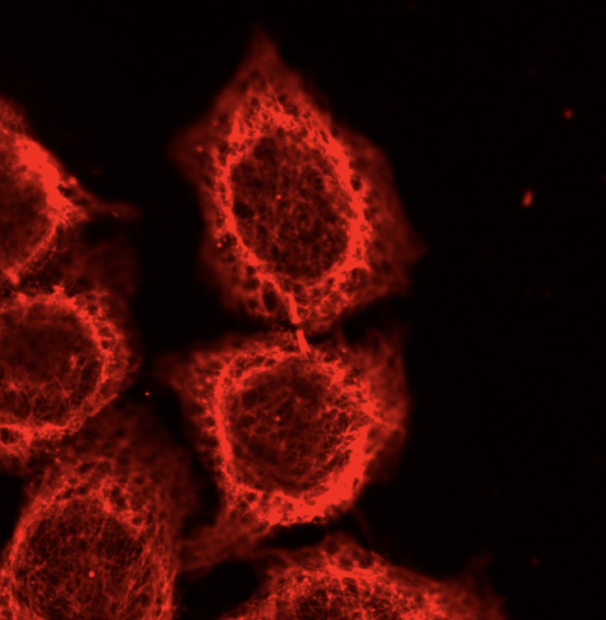
A middle stage midbody stained with tubulin

The midbody structure contains bundles of microtubules derived from the mitotic spindle which compacts during the final stages of cell division. It has a typical diameter of 1 micrometre and a length of 3 to 5 micrometres. Aside from microtubules it also contains various proteins involved in cytokinesis, asymmetric cell division, and chromosome segregation and RNAs.

The midbody is important for completing the final stages of cytokinesis, a process called abscission. During symmetric abscission, the midbody is severed at each end and released into the cellular environment.

== Role in intercellular signalling ==
It was long assumed that the midbody was simply a structural part of cytokinesis, and was totally degraded with the completion of mitosis. However, it is now understood that post-abscission, the midbody is converted into an endosome-like signalling molecule, and can be internalised by nearby cells.

This endosome is marked by MKLP1, and can persist for up to 48 hours once internalised into another cell. It is coated in Actin, which is slowly degraded by the internalising cell.

== Related proteins ==
- MKLP1
- TEX14
- CEP55
- Aurora Kinase B
