= Cleavage furrow =

Plasma membrane invagination at the cell division site

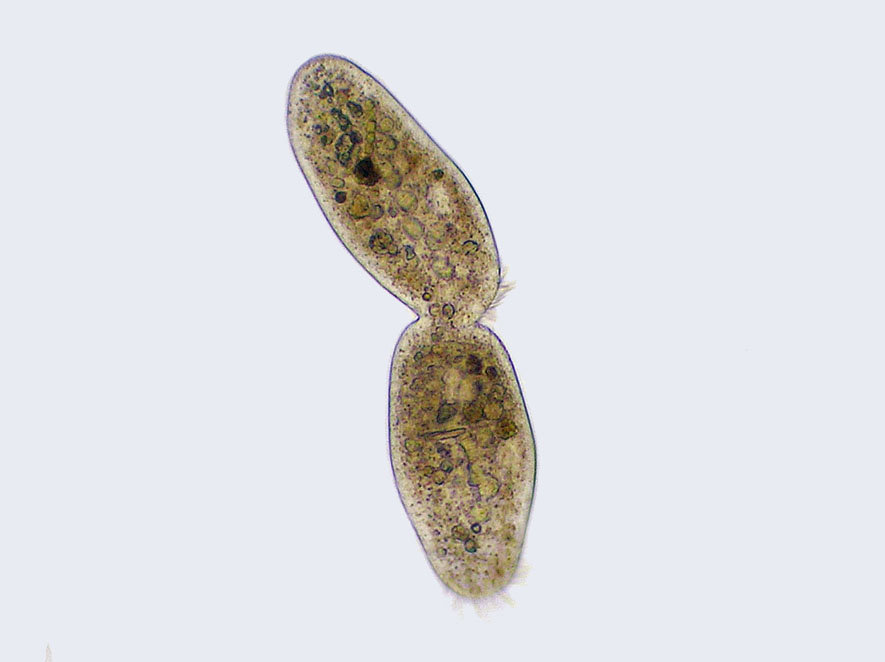
Cilliate undergoing the last processes of binary fission, with the cleavage furrow being clearly visible.

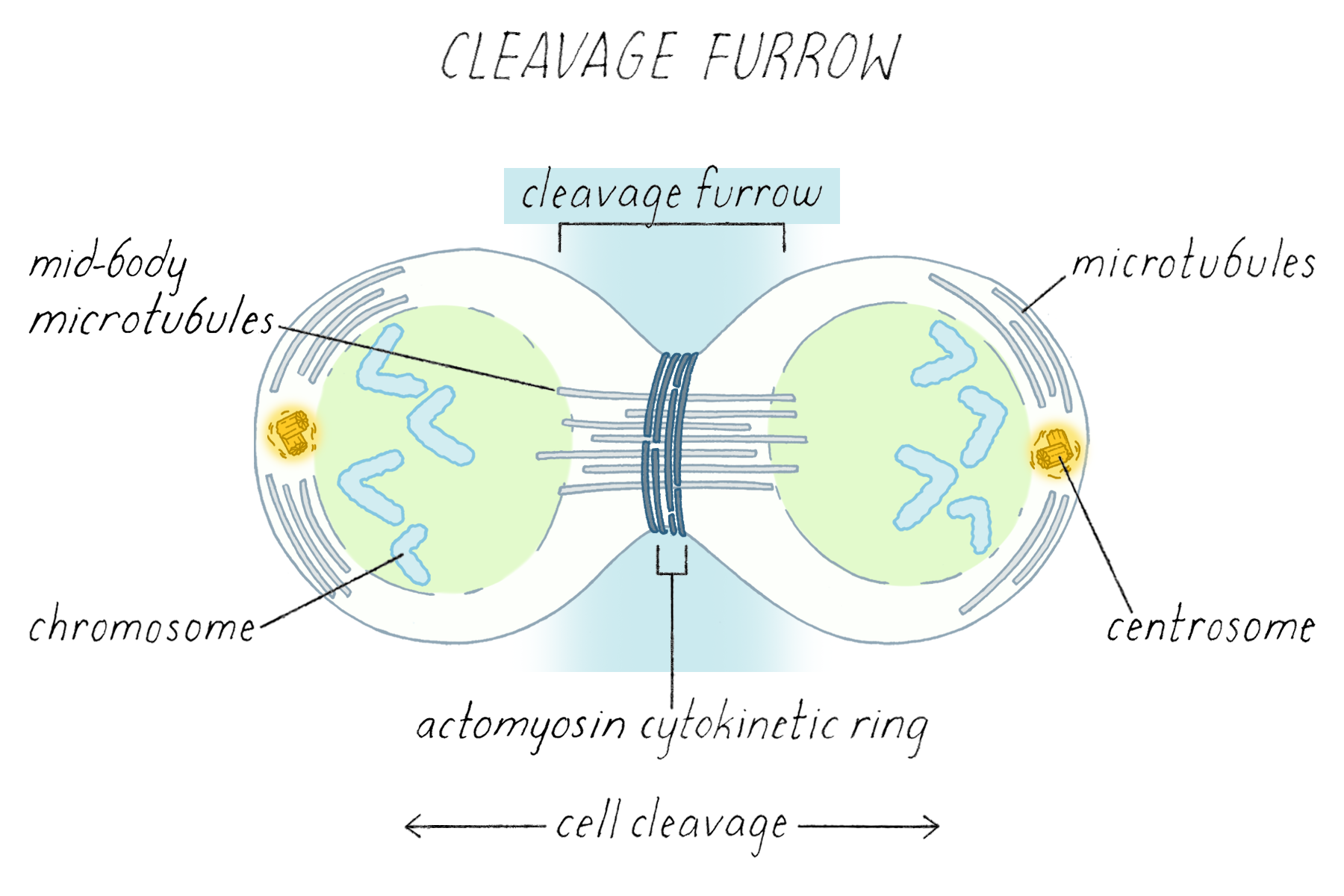
A midline invagination that forms in the late stages of mitosis. The actomyosin contractile ring in the cleavage furrow acts as a constricting “draw string” that separates the dividing cell into two daughter cells.

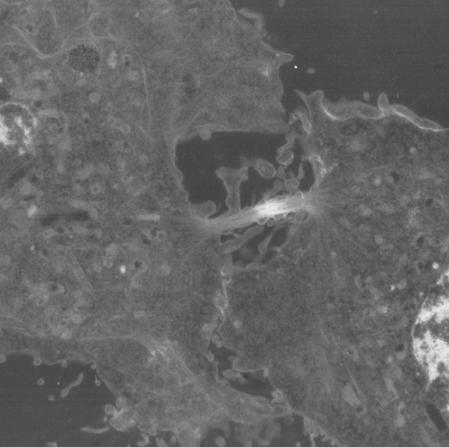
In this electron micrograph of a cell, the cleavage furrow has nearly completely divided the cell.

In cell biology, the cleavage furrow is the indentation of the cell's surface that begins the progression of cleavage, by which animal and some algal cells undergo cytokinesis, the final splitting of the membrane, in the process of cell division. The same proteins responsible for muscle contraction, actin and myosin, begin the process of forming the cleavage furrow, creating an actomyosin ring. Other cytoskeletal proteins and actin binding proteins are involved in the procedure.

== Mechanism ==
Plant cells do not perform cytokinesis through this exact method but the two procedures are not totally different. Animal cells form an actin-myosin contractile ring within the equatorial region of the cell membrane that constricts to form the cleavage furrow. In plant cells, Golgi vesicle secretions form a cell plate or septum on the equatorial plane of the cell wall by the action of microtubules of the phragmoplast. The cleavage furrow in animal cells and the phragmoplast in plant cells are complex structures made up of microtubules and microfilaments that aide in the final separation of the cells into two identical daughter cells.

== Cell cycle ==
The cell cycle begins with interphase when the DNA replicates, the cell grows and prepares to enter mitosis. Mitosis includes four phases: prophase, metaphase, anaphase, and telophase. Prophase is the initial phase when spindle fibers appear that function to move the chromosomes toward opposite poles. This spindle apparatus consists of microtubules, microfilaments and a complex network of various proteins. During metaphase, the chromosomes line up using the spindle apparatus in the middle of the cell along the equatorial plate. The chromosomes move to opposite poles during anaphase and remain attached to the spindle fibers by their centromeres. Animal cell cleavage furrow formation is caused by a ring of actin microfilaments called the contractile ring, which forms during early anaphase. Myosin is present in the region of the contractile ring as concentrated microfilaments and actin filaments are predominant in this region. The actin filaments here are both pre-existing and new. Cleavage is driven by these motor proteins, actin and myosin, which are the same proteins involved with muscle contraction. During cellular cleavage, the contractile ring tightens around the cytoplasm of the cell until the cytoplasm is pinched into two daughter cells. During the final phase of mitosis, telophase, the furrow forms an intercellular bridge using mitotic spindle fibers. Phosphatidylethanolamine has been shown to be present during this time, which indicates that it may play a role in movement between the plasma membrane and contractile ring. The bridge is then broken and resealed to form two identical daughter cells during cytokinesis. The breakage is formed by microtubules and the resealing is negated by calcium dependent exocytosis using Golgi vesicles. In comparison, the plant cell septum and the animal cell mid-zone are analogous. Both require vesicular secretions by the Golgi apparatus for resealing and formation of the cytoskeletal network, in addition to microtubules and microfilaments for division and movement. The cleavage furrow mechanism in animal cells is a complex network of actin and myosin filaments, Golgi vesicles and calcium dependent channels enabling the cell to break apart, reseal and form new daughter cells with complete membranes.
