= SLC26A8 =

Protein-coding gene in the species Homo sapiens

Identifiers
- Aliases: SLC26A8, SPGF3, TAT1, solute carrier family 26 member 8
- External IDs: OMIM: 608480; MGI: 2385046; GeneCards: SLC26A8

Gene location (Human)
Chr.	Chromosome 6 (human)
Band	6p21.31	Start	35,943,516 bp
Band	6p21.31	End	36,024,868 bp

Gene location (Mouse)
Chr.	Chromosome 17 (mouse)
Band	17 A3.3|17 14.82 cM	Start	28,856,757 bp
Band	17 A3.3|17 14.82 cM	End	28,909,207 bp
RNA expression pattern
Bgee	Human / Mouse (ortholog); Top expressed in: left testis; right testis; cerebellar hemisphere; right hemisphere of cerebellum; secondary oocyte; sperm; testicle; blood; bone marrow cell; right frontal lobe / Top expressed in: spermatocyte; spermatid; seminiferous tubule; neural layer of retina; superior frontal gyrus; primary visual cortex; granulocyte; embryo; cerebellar cortex; dentate gyrus of hippocampal formation granule cell; More reference expression data
BioGPS	n/a
Gene ontology
Molecular function	anion transmembrane transporter activity; sulfate transmembrane transporter activity; secondary active sulfate transmembrane transporter activity; bicarbonate transmembrane transporter activity; oxalate transmembrane transporter activity; protein binding; chloride channel activity; chloride transmembrane transporter activity
Cellular component	integral component of membrane; membrane; plasma membrane; integral component of plasma membrane
Biological process	flagellated sperm motility; cell differentiation; oxalate transport; sulfate transport; regulation of membrane potential; regulation of intracellular pH; ion transport; anion transport; multicellular organism development; bicarbonate transport; meiosis; transmembrane transport; spermatogenesis; sperm capacitation; chloride transport; chloride transmembrane transport; sulfate transmembrane transport; anion transmembrane transport
Sources:Amigo / QuickGO
Orthologs
Databases	NCBI: entry; OMA: entry
Species	Human	Mouse
Entrez	116369	224661
Ensembl	ENSG00000112053	ENSMUSG00000036196
UniProt	Q96RN1	Q8R0C3
RefSeq (mRNA)	NM_001193476; NM_052961; NM_138718	NM_001290320; NM_146076
RefSeq (protein)	NP_001180405; NP_443193; NP_619732	NP_001277249
Location (UCSC)	Chr 6: 35.94 – 36.02 Mb	Chr 17: 28.86 – 28.91 Mb
PubMed search
- Wikidata
View/Edit Human	View/Edit Mouse

Testis anion transporter 1 is a protein that in humans is encoded by the SLC26A8 gene.

== Function ==
This gene is one member of a family of sulfate/anion transporter genes. Family members are well conserved in their genomic (number and size of exons) and protein (aa length among species) structures yet have markedly different tissue expression patterns. This gene is expressed primarily in spermatocytes. Two transcript variants encoding different isoforms have been found.

== Interactions ==
SLC26A8 has been shown to interact with RACGAP1.
