= PARD6A =

Protein-coding gene in the species Homo sapiens

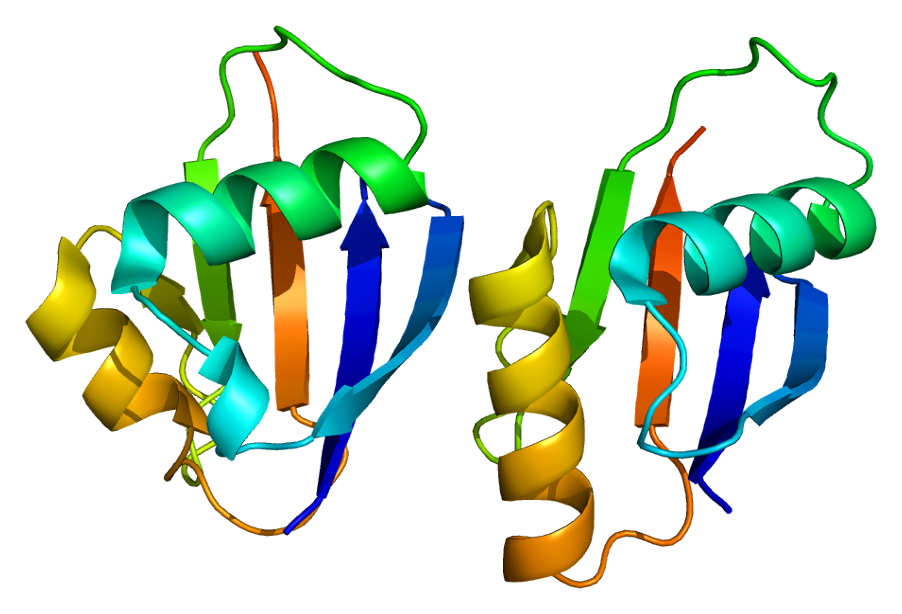

Identifiers
- Aliases: PARD6A, PAR-6A, PAR6, PAR6C, PAR6alpha, TAX40, TIP-40, par-6 family cell polarity regulator alpha
- External IDs: OMIM: 607484; MGI: 1927223; GeneCards: PARD6A
Available structures
PDB	Ortholog search: PDBe RCSB
PDB	List of PDB id codes 1WMH

Gene location (Human)
Chr.	Chromosome 16 (human)
Band	16q22.1	Start	67,660,946 bp
Band	16q22.1	End	67,662,774 bp

Gene location (Mouse)
Chr.	Chromosome 8 (mouse)
Band	8|8 D3	Start	106,427,780 bp
Band	8|8 D3	End	106,430,128 bp
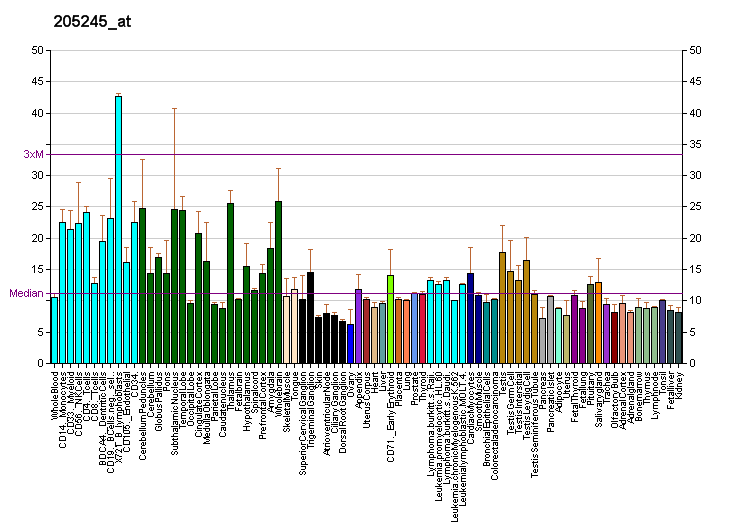
RNA expression pattern
Bgee	Human / Mouse (ortholog); Top expressed in: right hemisphere of cerebellum; prefrontal cortex; sperm; right frontal lobe; paraflocculus of cerebellum; right testis; glutes; frontal pole; left testis; triceps brachii muscle / Top expressed in: lobe of cerebellum; cerebellar vermis; spermatocyte; seminiferous tubule; spermatid; pontine nuclei; primary oocyte; medial vestibular nucleus; deep cerebellar nuclei; visual cortex; More reference expression data
BioGPS	More reference expression data
Gene ontology
Molecular function	transcription factor binding; GTP-dependent protein binding; protein binding; protein kinase C binding
Cellular component	cytosol; cell projection; membrane; bicellular tight junction; ruffle; plasma membrane; cell cortex; nucleus; cytoplasm; centrosome; microtubule organizing center; cytoskeleton; cell junction; centriolar satellite; protein-containing complex; apical plasma membrane
Biological process	negative regulation of protein phosphorylation; cell division; cell-cell junction maintenance; bicellular tight junction assembly; cell cycle; viral process; transforming growth factor beta receptor signaling pathway; Wnt signaling pathway, planar cell polarity pathway; positive regulation of protein localization to centrosome; centrosome cycle; establishment or maintenance of cell polarity; regulation of cellular localization; positive regulation of protein secretion
Sources:Amigo / QuickGO
Orthologs
Databases	NCBI: entry; OMA: entry
Species	Human	Mouse
Entrez	50855	56513
Ensembl	ENSG00000102981	ENSMUSG00000005699
UniProt	Q9NPB6	Q9Z101
RefSeq (mRNA)	NM_001037281; NM_016948	NM_001047435; NM_001047436; NM_001286344; NM_001286345; NM_019695
RefSeq (protein)	NP_001032358; NP_058644	NP_001040900; NP_001040901; NP_001273273; NP_001273274; NP_062669
Location (UCSC)	Chr 16: 67.66 – 67.66 Mb	Chr 8: 106.43 – 106.43 Mb
PubMed search
- Wikidata
View/Edit Human	View/Edit Mouse

Partitioning defective 6 homolog alpha is a protein that in humans is encoded by the PARD6A gene.

== Function ==
This gene is a member of the PAR6 family and encodes a protein with a PSD95/Discs-large/ZO1 (PDZ) domain and a semi-Cdc42/Rac interactive binding (CRIB) domain. This cell membrane protein is involved in asymmetrical cell division and cell polarization processes as a member of a multi-protein complex. The protein also has a role in the epithelial-to-mesenchymal transition (EMT) that characterizes the invasive phenotype associated with metastatic carcinomas. Alternate transcriptional splice variants, encoding different isoforms, have been characterized.

A recent study shows that Par6 associates with PKC-ι but not with PKC-zeta in melanoma. Oncogenic PKC-iota can promote melanoma cell invasion by up-regulating PKC-ι/Par6 pathway during EMT. PKC-ι inhibition or knockdown resulted an increase E-cadherin and RhoA levels while decreasing total Vimentin, phophorylated Vimentin (S39) and Par6 in metastatic melanoma cells. These results suggested that PKC-ι is involved in signaling pathways which upregulate EMT in melanoma.

== Interactions ==
PARD6A has been shown to interact with:

- CDC42,
- ECT2
- Protein kinase Mζ, and
- RAC1.
- Protein kinase C-ι.
