= CEP55 =

Protein-coding gene in the species Homo sapiens

Identifiers
- Aliases: CEP55, C10orf3, CT111, URCC6, centrosomal protein 55, MARCH
- External IDs: OMIM: 610000; MGI: 1921357; GeneCards: CEP55
Available structures
PDB	Ortholog search: PDBe RCSB
PDB	List of PDB id codes 3E1R, 3WUT, 3WUU, 3WUV

Gene location (Human)
Chr.	Chromosome 10 (human)
Band	10q23.33	Start	93,496,612 bp
Band	10q23.33	End	93,529,092 bp

Gene location (Mouse)
Chr.	Chromosome 19 (mouse)
Band	19|19 C2	Start	38,043,459 bp
Band	19|19 C2	End	38,062,871 bp
RNA expression pattern
Bgee	Human / Mouse (ortholog); Top expressed in: testicle; ventricular zone; gonad; secondary oocyte; sperm; ganglionic eminence; stromal cell of endometrium; rectum; gingival epithelium; mucosa of transverse colon / Top expressed in: primary oocyte; zygote; secondary oocyte; endothelial cell of lymphatic vessel; spermatocyte; cumulus cell; atrioventricular valve; medial ganglionic eminence; abdominal wall; ventricular zone; More reference expression data
BioGPS	n/a
Gene ontology
Molecular function	protein binding
Cellular component	cytoplasm; centriole; centrosome; cleavage furrow; cytoskeleton; membrane; intercellular bridge; midbody; microtubule organizing center; plasma membrane; Flemming body
Biological process	cell division; cell cycle; septum digestion after cytokinesis; mitotic cytokinesis; mitotic metaphase plate congression; nucleus organization; establishment of protein localization; renal system development; cranial skeletal system development; multicellular organism development; regulation of phosphatidylinositol 3-kinase signaling; midbody abscission
Sources:Amigo / QuickGO
Orthologs
Databases	NCBI: entry; OMA: entry
Species	Human	Mouse
Entrez	55165	74107
Ensembl	ENSG00000138180	ENSMUSG00000024989
UniProt	Q53EZ4	Q8BT07
RefSeq (mRNA)	NM_001127182; NM_018131	NM_001164362; NM_028293; NM_028760; NM_001360663
RefSeq (protein)	NP_001120654; NP_060601	NP_001157834; NP_082569; NP_083036; NP_001347592
Location (UCSC)	Chr 10: 93.5 – 93.53 Mb	Chr 19: 38.04 – 38.06 Mb
PubMed search
- Wikidata
View/Edit Human	View/Edit Mouse

Centrosomal protein of 55 kDa (Cep55) is a protein that in humans is encoded by the CEP55 gene.

Cep55 is a mitotic phosphoprotein that plays a key role in cytokinesis, the final stage of cell division. and cilia formation in neural stem cells.
