= Actomyosin ring =

Cellular formation during cytokinesis

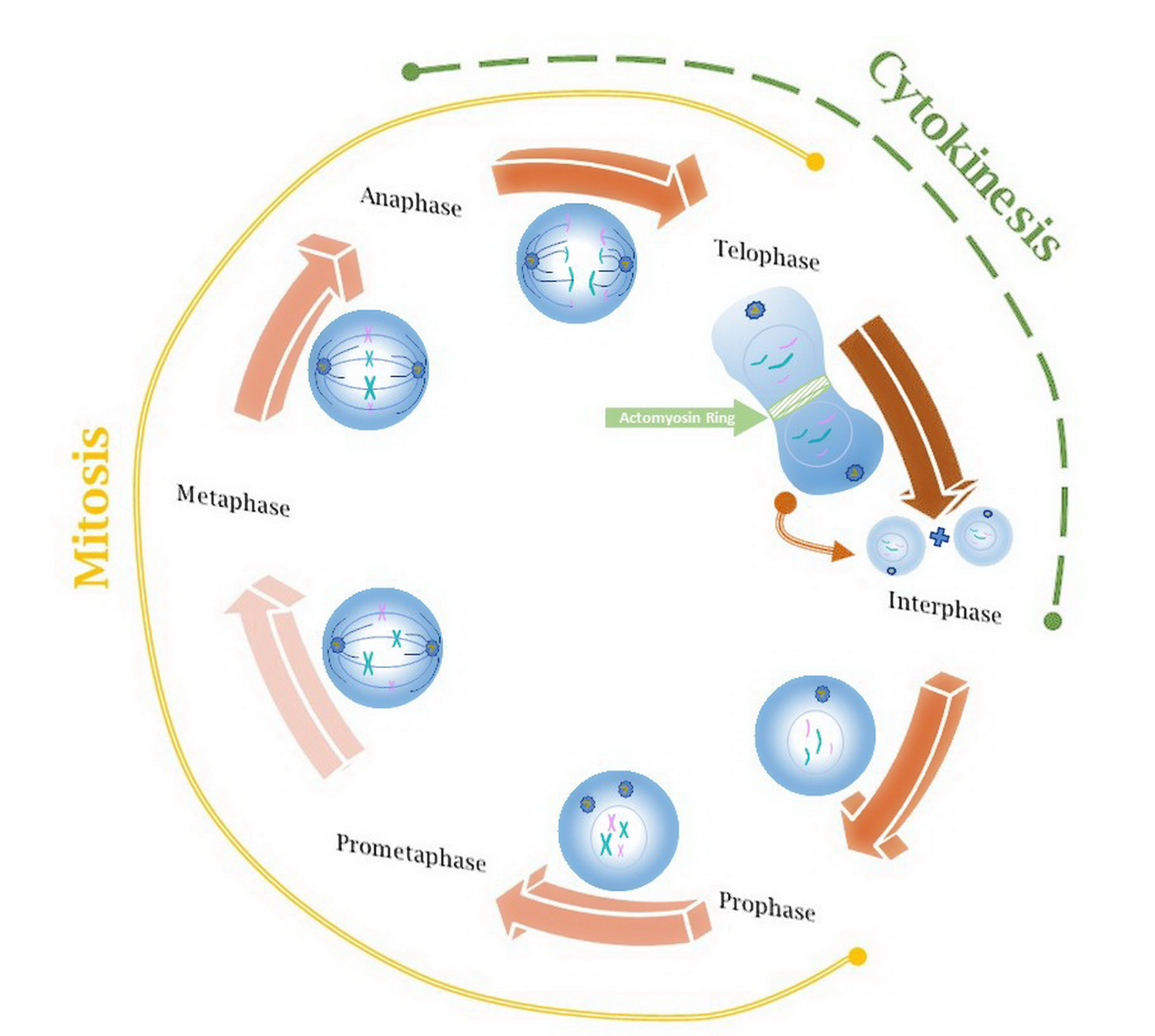
Fig.1. Cell cycle showing the formation of the actomyosin ring during telophase or early cytokinesis stage.

An actomyosin ring, contractile ring, or cytokinetic ring is a prominent structure during cytokinesis. It forms perpendicular to the axis of the spindle apparatus towards the end of telophase, in which sister chromatids are identically separated at the opposite sides of the spindle forming nuclei (Figure 1). The actomyosin ring follows an orderly sequence of events: identification of the active division site, formation of the ring, constriction of the ring, and disassembly of the ring. It is composed of actin and myosin II bundles, thus the term actomyosin. The actomyosin ring operates in contractile motion, although the mechanism on how or what triggers the constriction is still an evolving topic. Other cytoskeletal proteins are also involved in maintaining the stability of the ring and driving its constriction. Apart from cytokinesis, in which the ring constricts as the cells divide (Figure 2), actomyosin ring constriction has also been found to activate during wound closure. During this process, actin filaments are degraded, preserving the thickness of the ring. After cytokinesis is complete, one of the two daughter cells inherits a remnant known as the midbody ring.

Activation of the cell-cycle kinase (e.g. Rho-kinases) during telophase initiates constriction of the actomyosin ring by creating a groove that migrates in an inward motion. Rho-kinases such as ROCK1 has been found to regulate actomyosin contraction through phosphorylation of the myosin light chain (MLC). This mechanism promotes cell-cell contacts and integrity leading to adhesion formation.

== Variation between kingdoms ==
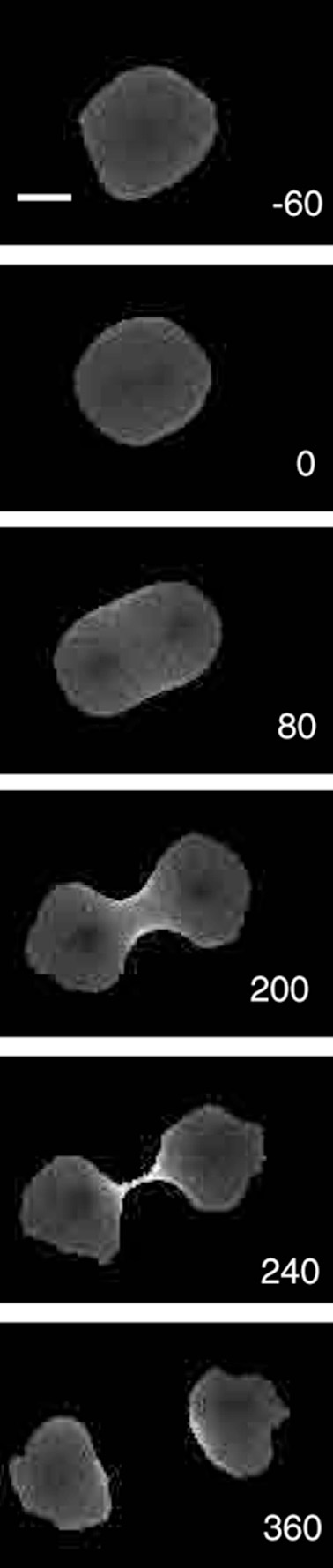
Fig. 2. The actomyosin ring induces formation of the cleavage furrow (4th from top) to assist cell cleavage.

In animals, the ring forms along the cleavage furrow on the inside of the plasma membrane then splits by abscission. In fungi, it forms at the mother-bud neck before mitosis. Septin is heavily involved in the formation of the fungal AMR. In most bacteria and many archaea a homologous structure called the Z-ring forms out of FtsZ, a homolog of tubulin. Chloroplasts form an analogous structure out of FtsZ. These structures are not made out of actomyosin, but serve a similar role in constricting and permitting cytokinesis. In plant cells, there is no actomyosin ring. Instead, a cell plate grows centrifugally outwards from the center of the plane of division until it fuses with the existing cell wall.

== See also ==
- Cytokinesis § Actin-myosin ring assembly and contraction
