= POM121 =

Protein-coding gene in the species Homo sapiens

Identifiers
- Aliases: POM121, P145, POM121A, POM121 transmembrane nucleoporin
- External IDs: OMIM: 615753; MGI: 2137624; HomoloGene: 70878; GeneCards: POM121; OMA:POM121 - orthologs

Gene location (Human)
| Chr. | Chromosome 7 (human) |
| Band | 7q11.23 | Start | 72,879,365 bp |
| Band | 7q11.23 | End | 72,951,440 bp |

Gene location (Mouse)
| Chr. | Chromosome 5 (mouse) |
| Band | 5|5 G2 | Start | 135,404,995 bp |
| Band | 5|5 G2 | End | 135,423,400 bp |
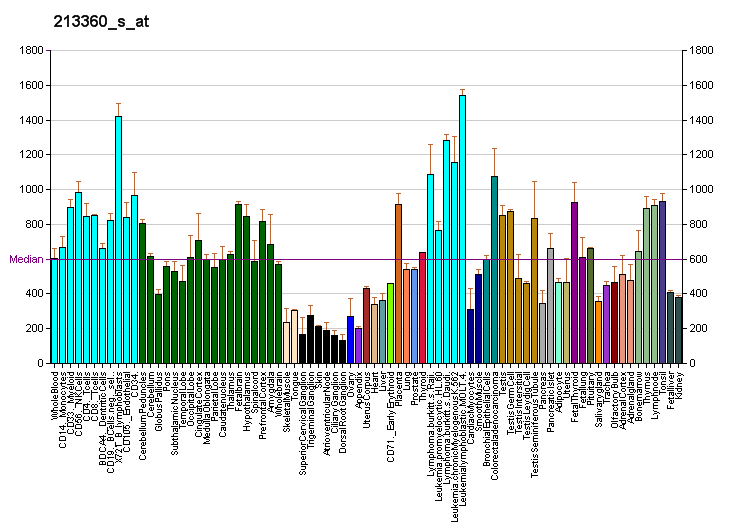

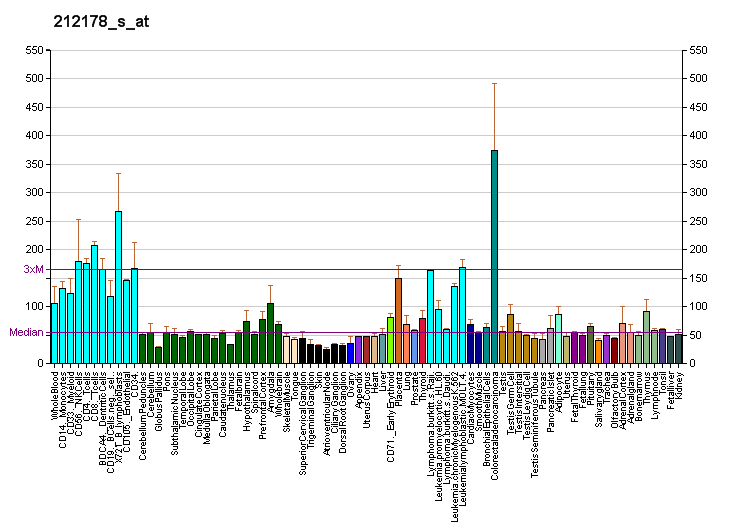
RNA expression pattern
| Bgee | Human / Mouse (ortholog); Top expressed in: granulocyte; right hemisphere of cerebellum; ventricular zone; body of stomach; gastrocnemius muscle; left ovary; ganglionic eminence; stromal cell of endometrium; body of pancreas; right ovary / Top expressed in: Paneth cell; ascending aorta; fossa; motor neuron; condyle; fetal liver hematopoietic progenitor cell; aortic valve; Gonadal ridge; Rostral migratory stream; primitive streak; More reference expression data |
| BioGPS | More reference expression data |
Gene ontology
| Molecular function | protein binding; structural constituent of nuclear pore; nuclear localization sequence binding |
| Cellular component | integral component of membrane; nuclear envelope; endoplasmic reticulum membrane; membrane; endoplasmic reticulum; nucleus; nuclear pore central transport channel; nuclear pore nuclear basket; nucleoplasm; nuclear membrane; nuclear pore; host cell |
| Biological process | mRNA transport; protein transport; viral process; mRNA export from nucleus; RNA export from nucleus; protein import into nucleus; regulation of glycolytic process; tRNA export from nucleus; protein sumoylation; viral transcription; regulation of gene silencing by miRNA; intracellular transport of virus; regulation of cellular response to heat |
Sources:Amigo / QuickGO
Orthologs
| Species | Human | Mouse |
| Entrez | 9883 | 107939 |
| Ensembl | ENSG00000196313 | ENSMUSG00000053293 |
| UniProt | Q96HA1 | Q8K3Z9 |
| RefSeq (mRNA) | NM_001257190; NM_172020; NM_001367610 | NM_148932 |
| RefSeq (protein) | NP_001244119; NP_742017; NP_001354539 | NP_683734 |
| Location (UCSC) | Chr 7: 72.88 – 72.95 Mb | Chr 5: 135.4 – 135.42 Mb |
| PubMed search |
- Wikidata
| View/Edit Human | View/Edit Mouse |

Nuclear envelope pore membrane protein POM 121 is a protein that in humans is encoded by the POM121 gene. Alternatively spliced variants that encode different protein isoforms have been described but the full-length nature of only one has been determined.

== Function ==
The nuclear envelope creates distinct nuclear and cytoplasmic compartments in eukaryotic cells. It consists of two concentric membranes perforated by nuclear pores, large protein complexes that form aqueous channels to regulate the flow of macromolecules between the nucleus and the cytoplasm. These complexes are composed of at least 100 different polypeptide subunits, many of which belong to the nucleoporin family. This gene encodes a member of the FG-repeat-containing nucleoporins. The protein encoded by this gene is an integral membrane protein that localizes to the central spoke ring complex and participates in anchoring the nuclear pore complex to the nuclear envelope.

Antibodies against this protein can be used to identify the nuclear envelope in immunofluorescence experiments.
