= KIF14 =

Protein-coding gene in humans

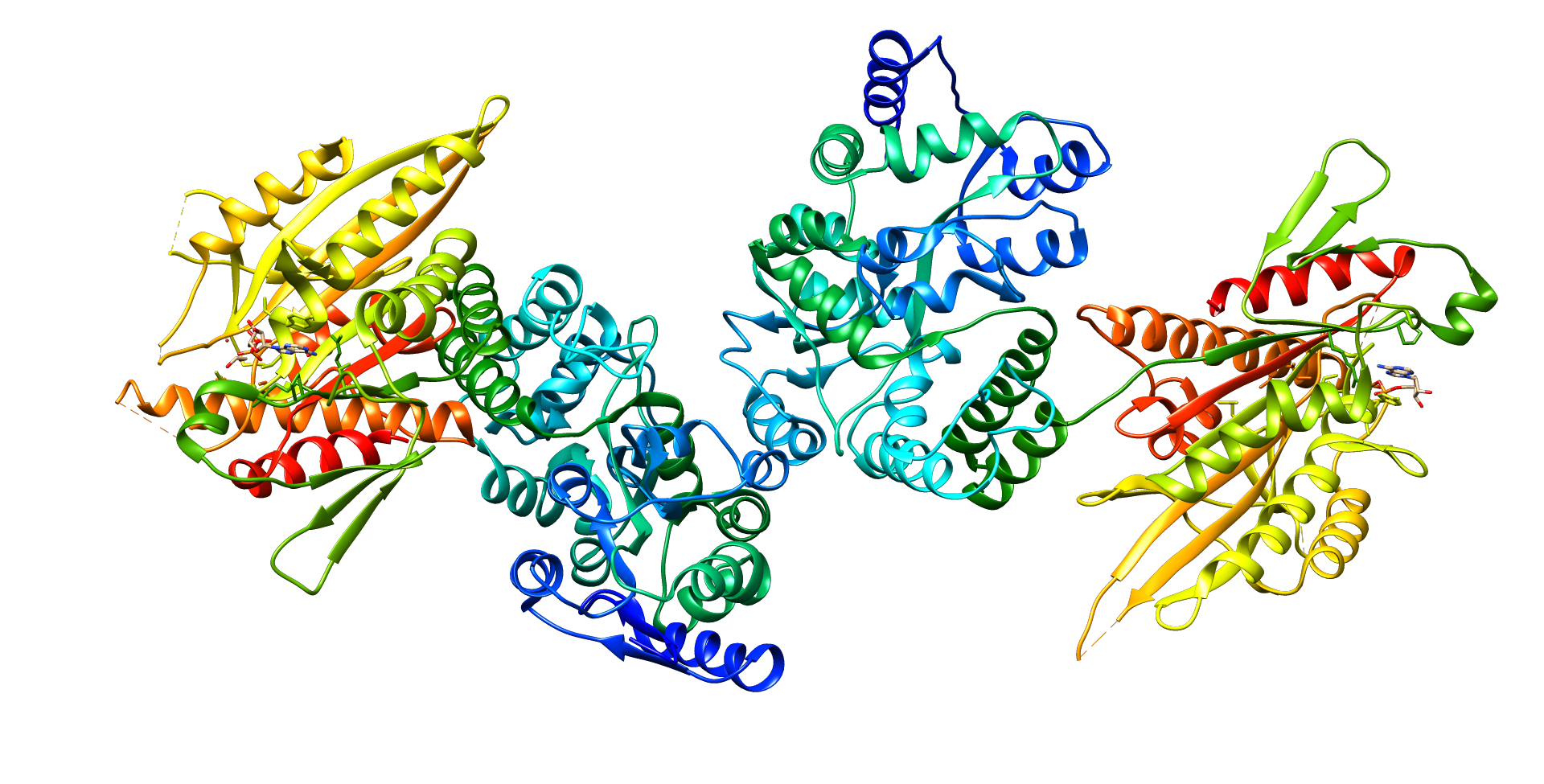

Identifiers
- Aliases: KIF14, MKS12, kinesin family member 14, MCPH20
- External IDs: OMIM: 611279; MGI: 1098226; GeneCards: KIF14
Available structures
PDB	Ortholog search: PDBe RCSB
PDB	List of PDB id codes 4OZQ

Gene location (Human)
Chr.	Chromosome 1 (human)
Band	1q32.1	Start	200,551,497 bp
Band	1q32.1	End	200,620,751 bp

Gene location (Mouse)
Chr.	Chromosome 1 (mouse)
Band	1 E4|1 59.8 cM	Start	136,394,081 bp
Band	1 E4|1 59.8 cM	End	136,459,249 bp
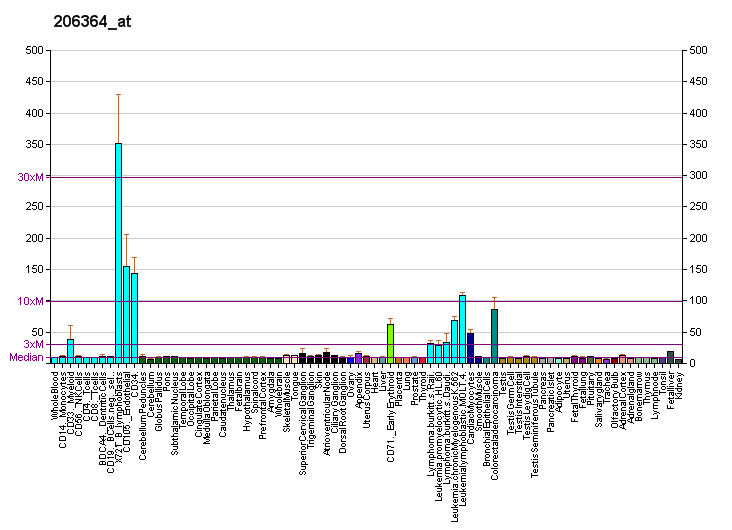
RNA expression pattern
Bgee	Human / Mouse (ortholog); Top expressed in: secondary oocyte; trabecular bone; gonad; ventricular zone; buccal mucosa cell; testicle; embryo; bone marrow; thymus; ganglionic eminence / Top expressed in: zygote; tail of embryo; genital tubercle; secondary oocyte; spermatocyte; ventricular zone; spermatid; yolk sac; blastocyst; embryo; More reference expression data
BioGPS	More reference expression data
Gene ontology
Molecular function	tubulin binding; nucleotide binding; protein kinase binding; plus-end-directed microtubule motor activity; PDZ domain binding; microtubule motor activity; microtubule binding; ATP binding; protein binding; ATPase activity
Cellular component	spindle; cytoplasm; kinesin complex; nucleus; membrane; midbody; microtubule; plasma membrane; spindle midzone; cytoskeleton; cytosol; Flemming body
Biological process	negative regulation of integrin activation; cerebral cortex development; negative regulation of apoptotic process; SCF-dependent proteasomal ubiquitin-dependent protein catabolic process; regulation of neuron apoptotic process; hippocampus development; regulation of cell growth; cell division; substrate adhesion-dependent cell spreading; regulation of G1/S transition of mitotic cell cycle; cell proliferation in forebrain; regulation of G2/M transition of mitotic cell cycle; cerebellar granular layer structural organization; olfactory bulb development; microtubule depolymerization; proteasome-mediated ubiquitin-dependent protein catabolic process; cerebellar Purkinje cell layer structural organization; regulation of myelination; positive regulation of cell population proliferation; regulation of Rap protein signal transduction; cerebellar cortex development; positive regulation of cytokinesis; negative regulation of neuron apoptotic process; establishment of protein localization; regulation of cell migration; mitotic metaphase plate congression; regulation of cell maturation; microtubule-based movement; activation of protein kinase activity; regulation of cell adhesion
Sources:Amigo / QuickGO
Orthologs
Databases	NCBI: entry; OMA: entry
Species	Human	Mouse
Entrez	9928	381293
Ensembl	ENSG00000118193	ENSMUSG00000041498
UniProt	Q15058	L0N7N1
RefSeq (mRNA)	NM_001305792; NM_014875	NM_001081258; NM_001287179
RefSeq (protein)	NP_001292721; NP_055690	NP_001274108
Location (UCSC)	Chr 1: 200.55 – 200.62 Mb	Chr 1: 136.39 – 136.46 Mb
PubMed search
- Wikidata
View/Edit Human	View/Edit Mouse

Kinesin-like protein KIF14 is a protein that in humans is encoded by the KIF14 gene.
