= Central spindle =

The central spindle is a microtubule based structure, which forms in between segregating chromosomes during anaphase where the two sets of microtubules, emanating from opposite halves of the cell, overlap, and become arranged into antiparallel bundles by various microtubule associated proteins (MAPs) and motor proteins. The central spindle is widely regarded as a key regulating center for cytokinesis, recruiting proteins for successful cleavage furrow positioning and membrane abscission. For these important roles to be achieved successfully the central spindle has to be carefully regulated to control the size of the overlap region, the alignment of those overlaps and the overall length and symmetry of the structure. Without this regulation, signaling faults in cytokinesis can occur, resulting in unequal chromosome segregation or polyploid cells, greatly increasing the risk of cancer.
