= ECT2 =

Gene of the species Homo sapiens

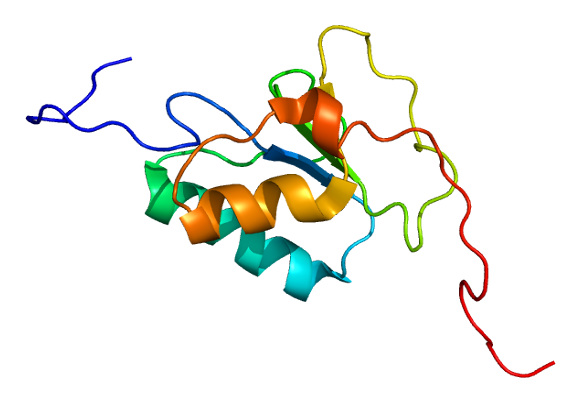

Identifiers
- Aliases: ECT2, ARHGEF31, epithelial cell transforming 2
- External IDs: OMIM: 600586; MGI: 95281; GeneCards: ECT2
Available structures
PDB	Ortholog search: PDBe RCSB
PDB	List of PDB id codes 3L46, 4N40

Gene location (Mouse)
Chr.	Chromosome 3 (mouse)
Band	3|3 A3	Start	27,151,371 bp
Band	3|3 A3	End	27,208,027 bp
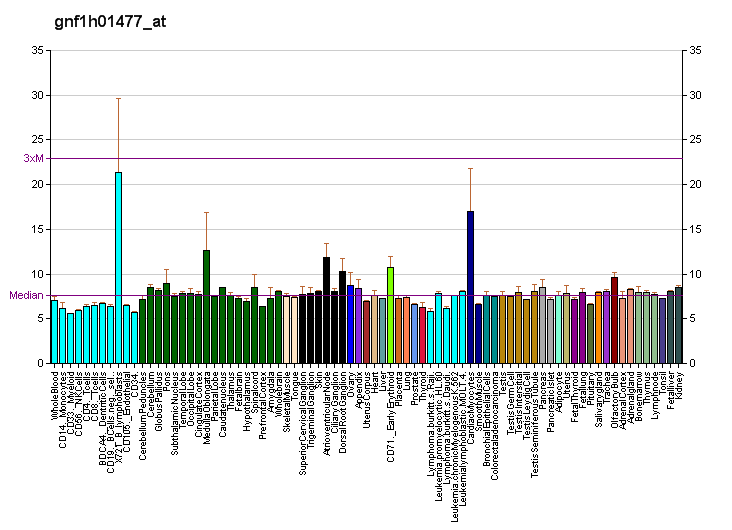

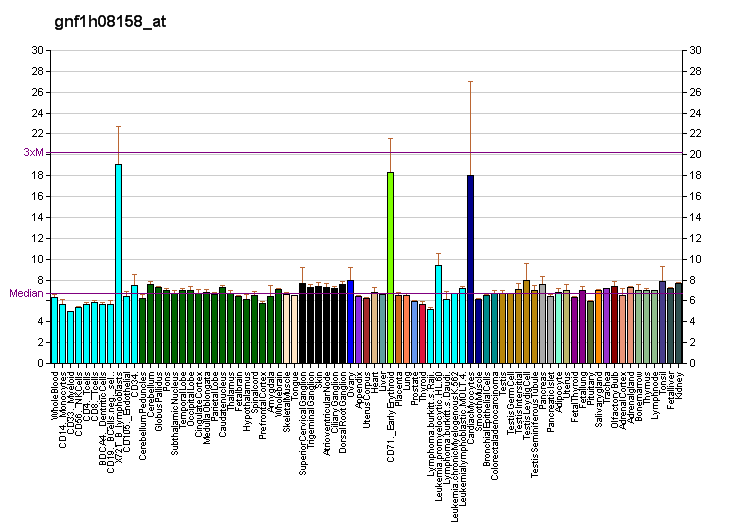

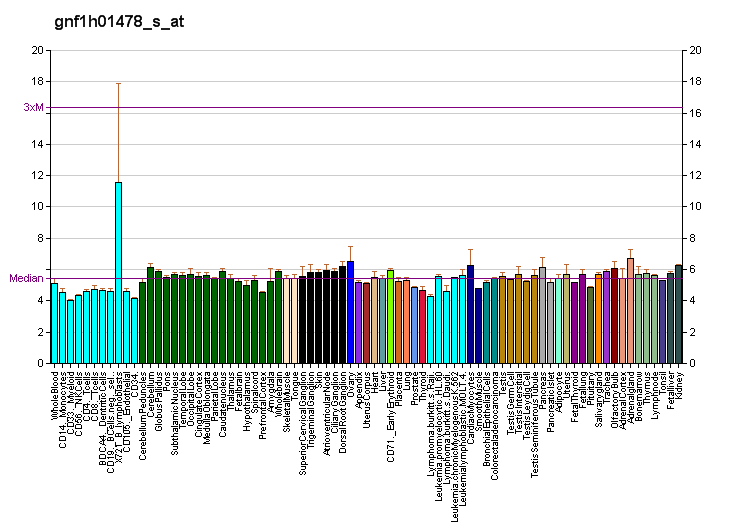
RNA expression pattern
Bgee	Human / Mouse (ortholog); n/a / Top expressed in: medial ganglionic eminence; zygote; secondary oocyte; primary oocyte; ventricular zone; tail of embryo; cumulus cell; genital tubercle; abdominal wall; Gonadal ridge
BioGPS	More reference expression data
Gene ontology
Molecular function	protein homodimerization activity; GTPase activator activity; signal transducer activity; protein binding; guanyl-nucleotide exchange factor activity
Cellular component	cytoplasm; centralspindlin complex; cell-cell junction; bicellular tight junction; spindle; cell junction; midbody; cleavage furrow; mitotic spindle; cytoskeleton; nucleus; cytosol
Biological process	cellular response to calcium ion; cell differentiation; intracellular signal transduction; activation of GTPase activity; nervous system development; cell division; positive regulation of cytokinesis; positive regulation of GTPase activity; positive regulation of neuron differentiation; bicellular tight junction assembly; cell morphogenesis; positive regulation of apoptotic process; cellular response to ionizing radiation; protein transport; positive regulation of I-kappaB kinase/NF-kappaB signaling; positive regulation of protein import into nucleus; cell cycle; regulation of protein kinase activity; regulation of Rho protein signal transduction; regulation of attachment of spindle microtubules to kinetochore; regulation of small GTPase mediated signal transduction; protein homooligomerization; activation of protein kinase activity; cellular response to hydrogen peroxide; transport; mitotic cytokinesis; cytokinesis; G protein-coupled receptor signaling pathway
Sources:Amigo / QuickGO
Orthologs
Databases	NCBI: entry; OMA: entry
Species	Human	Mouse
Entrez	1894	13605
Ensembl	ENSG00000114346	ENSMUSG00000027699
UniProt	Q9H8V3	Q07139
RefSeq (mRNA)	NM_001258315; NM_001258316; NM_018098	NM_001177625; NM_001177626; NM_007900
RefSeq (protein)	NP_001245244; NP_001245245; NP_060568; NP_001336023; NP_001336024 NP_001336025; NP_001336026; NP_001336027; NP_001336028; NP_001336029; NP_001336030; NP_001336031; NP_001336032; NP_001336033	NP_001171096; NP_001171097; NP_031926
Location (UCSC)	n/a	Chr 3: 27.15 – 27.21 Mb
PubMed search
- Wikidata
View/Edit Human	View/Edit Mouse

Protein ECT2 is a protein that in humans is encoded by the ECT2 gene.

== Function ==
The protein encoded by this gene is a transforming protein that is related to Rho-specific exchange factors and yeast cell cycle regulators. The expression of this gene is elevated with the onset of DNA synthesis and remains elevated during G2 and M phases. In situ hybridization analysis showed that expression is at a high level in cells undergoing mitosis in regenerating liver. Thus, this protein is expressed in a cell cycle-dependent manner during liver regeneration, and is thought to have an important role in the regulation of cytokinesis.

== Interactions ==
ECT2 has been shown to interact with PARD6A.
