= Telophase =

Final stage of mitosis and meiosis

Diagram of telophase

Telophase (from Ancient Greek τέλος (télos) 'end, result, completion' and φάσις (phásis) 'appearance') is the final stage in both meiosis and mitosis in a eukaryotic cell. During telophase, the effects of prophase and prometaphase (the nucleolus and nuclear membrane disintegrating) are reversed. As chromosomes reach the cell poles, a nuclear envelope is re-assembled around each set of chromatids, the nucleoli reappear, and chromosomes begin to decondense back into the expanded chromatin that is present during interphase. The mitotic spindle is disassembled and remaining spindle microtubules are depolymerized. Telophase accounts for approximately 2% of the cell cycle's duration.

Cytokinesis typically begins before late telophase and, when complete, segregates the two daughter nuclei between a pair of separate daughter cells.

Telophase is primarily driven by the dephosphorylation of mitotic cyclin-dependent kinase (Cdk) substrates.

== Dephosphorylation of Cdk substrates ==
The phosphorylation of the protein targets of M-Cdks (Mitotic Cyclin-dependent Kinases) drives spindle assembly, chromosome condensation and nuclear envelope breakdown in early mitosis. The dephosphorylation of these same substrates drives spindle disassembly, chromosome decondensation and the reformation of daughter nuclei in telophase. Establishing a degree of dephosphorylation permissive to telophase events requires both the inactivation of Cdks and the activation of phosphatases.

Cdk inactivation is primarily the result of the destruction of its associated cyclin. Cyclins are targeted for proteolytic degradation by the anaphase promoting complex (APC), also known as the cyclosome, a ubiquitin-ligase. The active, CDC20-bound APC (APC/C^{CDC20}) targets mitotic cyclins for degradation starting in anaphase. Experimental addition of non-degradable M-cyclin to cells induces cell cycle arrest in a post-anaphase/pre-telophase-like state with condensed chromosomes segregated to cell poles, an intact mitotic spindle, and no reformation of the nuclear envelope. This has been shown in frog (Xenopus) eggs, fruit flies (Drosophilla melanogaster), budding (Saccharomyces cerevisiae) and fission (Schizosaccharomyces pombe) yeast, and in multiple human cell lines.

The requirement for phosphatase activation can be seen in budding yeast, which do not have redundant phosphatases for mitotic exit and rely on the phosphatase cdc14. Blocking cdc14 activation in these cells results in the same phenotypic arrest as does blocking M-cyclin degradation.

Historically, it has been thought that anaphase and telophase are events that occur passively after satisfaction of the spindle-assembly checkpoint (SAC) that defines the metaphase-anaphase transition. However, the existence of differential phases to cdc14 activity between anaphase and telophase is suggestive of additional, unexplored late-mitotic checkpoints. Cdc14 is activated by its release into the nucleus, from sequestration in the nucleolus, and subsequent export into the cytoplasm. The Cdc-14 Early Anaphase Release pathway, which stabilizes the spindle, also releases cdc14 from the nucleolus but restricts it to the nucleus. Complete release and maintained activation of cdc14 is achieved by the separate Mitotic Exit Network (MEN) pathway to a sufficient degree (to trigger the spindle disassembly and nuclear envelope assembly) only after late anaphase.

Cdc14-mediated dephosphorylation activates downstream regulatory processes unique to telophase. For example, the dephosphorylation of CDH1 allows the APC/C to bind CDH1. APC/C^{CDH1} targets CDC20 for proteolysis, resulting in a cellular switch from APC/C^{CDC20} to APC/C^{CDH1} activity. The ubiquitination of mitotic cyclins continues along with that of APC/C^{CDH1}-specific targets such as the yeast mitotic spindle component, Ase1, and cdc5, the degradation of which is required for the return of cells to the G1 phase.

=== Additional mechanisms driving telophase ===
A shift in the whole-cell phosphoprotein profile is only the broadest of many regulatory mechanisms contributing to the onset of individual telophase events.

- The anaphase-mediated distancing of chromosomes from the metaphase plate may trigger spatial cues for the onset of telophase.
- An important regulator and effector of telophase is cdc48 (homologous to yeast cdc48 is human p97, both structurally and functionally), a protein that mechanically employs its ATPase activity to alter target protein conformation. Cdc48 is necessary for spindle disassembly, nuclear envelope assembly, and chromosome decondensation. Cdc48 modifies proteins structurally involved in these processes and also some ubiquitinated proteins which are thus targeted to the proteasome^{.}

== Mitotic spindle disassembly ==
Stages of late M phase in a vertebrate cell

The breaking of the mitotic spindle, common to the completion of mitosis in all eukaryotes, is the event most often used to define the anaphase-B to telophase transition, although the initiation of nuclear reassembly tends to precede that of spindle disassembly.

Spindle disassembly is an irreversible process which must effect not the ultimate degradation, but the reorganization of constituent microtubules; microtubules are detached from kinetochores and spindle pole bodies and return to their interphase states.

Spindle depolymerization during telophase occurs from the plus end and is, in this way, a reversal of spindle assembly. Subsequent microtubule array assembly is, unlike that of the polarized spindle, interpolar. This is especially apparent in animal cells which must immediately, following mitotic spindle disassembly, establish the antiparallel bundle of microtubules known as the central spindle in order to regulate cytokinesis. The ATPase p97 is required for the establishment of the relatively stable and long interphase microtubule arrays following disassembly of the highly dynamic and relatively short mitotic ones.

While spindle assembly has been well studied and characterized as a process where tentative structures are edified by the SAC, the molecular basis of spindle disassembly is not understood in comparable detail. The late-mitotic dephosphorylation cascade of M-Cdk substrates by the MEN is broadly held to be responsible for spindle disassembly. The phosphorylation states of microtubule stabilizing and destabilizing factors, as well as microtubule nucleators are key regulators of their activities. For example, NuMA is a minus-end crosslinking protein and Cdk substrate whose dissociation from the microtubule is effected by its dephosphorylation during telophase.

A general model for spindle disassembly in yeast is that the three functionally overlapping subprocesses of spindle disengagement, destabilization, and depolymerization are primarily effected by APC/C^{CDH1}, microtubule-stabilizer-specific kinases, and plus-end directed microtubule depolymerases, respectively. These effectors are known to be highly conserved between yeast and higher eukaryotes. The APC/C^{CDH1} targets crosslinking microtubule-associated proteins (NuMA, Ase1, Cin1 and more). AuroraB (yeast IpI1) phosphorylates the spindle-associated stabilizing protein EB1 (yeast Bim1), which then dissociates from microtubules, and the destabilizer She1, which then associates with microtubules. Kinesin8 (yeast Kip3), an ATP-dependent depolymerase, accelerate microtubule depolymerization at the plus end. It was shown the concurrent disruption of these mechanisms, but not of any one, results in dramatic spindle hyperstability during telophase, suggesting functional overlap despite the diversity of the mechanisms.

== Nuclear envelope reassembly ==
The main components of the nuclear envelope are a double membrane, nuclear pore complexes, and a nuclear lamina internal to the inner nuclear membrane. These components are dismantled during prophase and prometaphase and reconstructed during telophase, when the nuclear envelope reforms on the surface of separated sister chromatids. The nuclear membrane is fragmented and partly absorbed by the endoplasmic reticulum during prometaphase and the targeting of inner nuclear membrane protein-containing ER vesicles to the chromatin occurs during telophase in a reversal of this process. Membrane-forming vesicles aggregate directly to the surface of chromatin, where they fuse laterally into a continuous membrane.

Ran-GTP is required for early nuclear envelope assembly at the surface of the chromosomes: it releases envelope components sequestered by importin β during early mitosis. Ran-GTP localizes near chromosomes throughout mitosis, but does not trigger the dissociation of nuclear envelope proteins from importin β until M-Cdk targets are dephosphorylated in telophase. These envelope components include several nuclear pore components, the most studied of which is the nuclear pore scaffold protein ELYS, which can recognize DNA regions rich in A:T base pairs (in vitro), and may therefore bind directly to the DNA. However, experiments in Xenopus egg extracts have concluded that ELYS fails to associate with bare DNA and will only directly bind histone dimers and nucleosomes. After binding to chromatin, ELYS recruits other components of the nuclear pore scaffold and nuclear pore trans-membrane proteins. The nuclear pore complex is assembled and integrated in the nuclear envelope in an organized manner, consecutively adding Nup107-160, POM121, and FG Nups.

It is debated whether the mechanism of nuclear membrane reassembly involves initial nuclear pore assembly and subsequent recruitment of membrane vesicles around the pores or if the nuclear envelope forms primarily from extended ER cisternae, preceding nuclear pore assembly:

- In cells where the nuclear membrane fragments into non-ER vesicles during mitosis, a Ran-GTP–dependent pathway can direct these discrete vesicle populations to chromatin where they fuse to reform the nuclear envelope.
- In cells where the nuclear membrane is absorbed into the endoplasmic reticulum during mitosis, reassembly involves the lateral expansion around the chromatin with stabilization of the expanding membrane over the surface of the chromatin. Studies claiming this mechanism is a prerequisite to nuclear pore formation have found that bare-chromatin-associated Nup107–160 complexes are present in single units instead of as assembled pre-pores.

The envelope smoothens and expands following its enclosure of the whole chromatid set. This probably occurs due to the nuclear pores' import of lamin, which can be retained within a continuous membrane. The nuclear envelopes of Xenopus egg extracts failed to smoothen when nuclear import of lamin was inhibited, remaining wrinkled and closely bound to condensed chromosomes. However, in the case of ER lateral expansion, nuclear import is initiated before completion of the nuclear envelope reassembly, leading to a temporary intra-nuclear protein gradient between the distal and medial aspects of the forming nucleus.

Lamin subunits disassembled in prophase are inactivated and sequestered during mitosis. Lamina reassembly is triggered by lamin dephosphorylation (and additionally by methyl-esterification of COOH residues on lamin-B). Lamin-B can target chromatin as early as mid-anaphase. During telophase, when nuclear import is reestablished, lamin-A enters the reforming nucleus but continues to slowly assemble into the peripheral lamina over several hours in throughout the G1 phase.

Xenopus egg extracts and human cancer cell lines have been the primary models used for studying nuclear envelope reassembly.

Yeast lack lamins; their nuclear envelope remains intact throughout mitosis and nuclear division happens during cytokinesis.

== Chromosome decondensation ==
Chromosome decondensation (also known as relaxation or decompaction) into expanded chromatin is necessary for the cell's resumption of interphase processes, and occurs in parallel to nuclear envelope assembly during telophase in many eukaryotes. MEN-mediated Cdk dephosphorylation is necessary for chromosome decondensation.

In vertebrates, chromosome decondensation is initiated only after nuclear import is reestablished. If lamin transport through nuclear pores is prevented, chromosomes remain condensed following cytokinesis, and cells fail to reenter the next S phase. In mammals, DNA licensing for S phase (the association of chromatin to the multiple protein factors necessary for its replication) also occurs coincidentally with the maturation of the nuclear envelope during late telophase. This can be attributed to and provides evidence for the nuclear import machinery's reestablishment of interphase nuclear and cytoplasmic protein localizations during telophase.

== See also ==
- Cytoskeleton – Network of filamentous proteins that forms the internal framework of cells
