= Cytokinesis =

Final stage of cell division

Diagram of cytokinesis

Cytokinesis (/ˌsaɪtoʊkɪˈniːsɪs/) is the final stage of cell division in the cell cycle, following mitosis. During cytokinesis the cytoplasm of a single eukaryotic cell is divided into two daughter cells. The cell's spindle apparatus partitions and transports duplicated chromatids into the cytoplasm of the separating daughter cells. It thereby ensures that chromosome number and complement are maintained from one generation to the next and that, except in special cases, the daughter cells will be functional copies of the parent cell.

Particular functions demand asymmetric cell division; for example, in oogenesis in animals, the ovum takes almost all the cytoplasm and organelles. This leaves very little for the resulting polar bodies, which in most species die without function, though they do take on various special functions in other species. Another form of mitosis occurs in tissues such as liver and skeletal muscle that omits cytokinesis, thereby yielding multinucleated cells (see syncytium).

Plant cytokinesis differs from animal cytokinesis, partly because of the rigidity of plant cell walls. Instead of plant cells forming a cleavage furrow such as develops between animal daughter cells, a dividing structure known as the cell plate forms in the cytoplasm and grows into a new, doubled cell wall between plant daughter cells. It divides the cell into two daughter cells.

Cytokinesis largely resembles the prokaryotic process of binary fission, but because of differences between prokaryotic and eukaryotic cell structures and functions, the mechanisms differ. For instance, a bacterial cell has a single circular chromosome, in contrast to the linear, usually multiple, chromosomes of a eukaryotic cell. Accordingly, bacteria construct no mitotic spindle in cell division. Also, duplication of prokaryotic DNA takes place during the actual separation of chromosomes; in mitosis, duplication takes place during the interphase before mitosis begins, though the daughter chromatids don't separate completely before the anaphase.

== Etymology and pronunciation ==
The word "cytokinesis" (/ˌsaɪtoʊkaɪˈniːsɪs, -tə-, -kə-/) uses combining forms of cyto- + kine- + -sis, Neo-Latin from Classical Latin and Ancient Greek, reflecting "cell" and kinesis ("motion, movement"). It was coined by Charles Otis Whitman in 1887.

Origin of this term is from Greek κύτος (kytos, a hollow), Latin derivative cyto (cellular), Greek κίνησις (kínesis, movement).

== Animal cell ==
Animal cell telophase and cytokinesis

In an animal cell cytokinesis begins shortly after the onset of sister chromatid separation in the anaphase of mitosis. The process can be divided to the following distinct steps: anaphase spindle reorganization, division plane specification, cytokinetic ring assembly and contraction, and abscission. Faithful partitioning of the genome to emerging daughter cells is ensured through the tight temporal coordination of the above individual events by molecular signaling pathways.

=== Anaphase spindle reorganization ===
Animal cell cytokinesis starts with the stabilization of microtubules and reorganization of the mitotic spindle to form the central spindle. The central spindle (or spindle midzone) forms when non-kinetochore microtubule fibers are bundled between the spindle poles. A number of different species including H. sapiens, D. melanogaster and C. elegans require the central spindle in order to efficiently undergo cytokinesis, although the specific phenotype associated with its absence varies from one species to the next (for example, certain Drosophila cell types are incapable of forming a cleavage furrow without the central spindle, whereas in both C. elegans embryos and human tissue culture cells a cleavage furrow is observed to form and ingress, but then regress before cytokinesis is complete).

The process of mitotic spindle reorganization and central spindle formation is caused by the decline of CDK1 activity during anaphase. The decline of CDK1 activity at the transition from metaphase to anaphase leads to dephosphorylating of inhibitory sites on multiple central spindle components. First of all, the removal of a CDK1 phosphorylation from a subunit of the CPC (the chromosomal passenger complex) allows its translocalization to the central spindle from the centromeres, where it is located during metaphase. Besides being a structural component of the central spindle itself, CPC also plays a role in the phosphoregulation of other central spindle components, including PRC1 (microtubule-bundling protein required for cytokinesis 1) and MKLP1 (a kinesin motor protein). Originally inhibited by CDK1-mediated phosphorylation, PRC1 is now able to form a homodimer that selectively binds to the interface between antiparallel microtubules, facilitating spatial organization of the microtubules of the central spindle. MKLP1, together with the Rho-family GTPase activating protein CYK-4 (also termed MgcRacGAP), forms the centralspindlin complex. Centralspindlin binds to the central spindle as higher-order clusters. The centralspindlin cluster formation is promoted by phosphorylation of MLKP1 by Aurora B, a component of CPC.

In short, the self-assembly of central spindle is initiated through the phosphoregulation of multiple central spindle components by the decline of CDK1 activity, either directly or indirectly, at the metaphase-anaphase transition. The central spindle may have multiple functions in cytokinesis including the control of cleavage furrow positioning, the delivery of membrane vesicles to the cleavage furrow, and the formation of the midbody structure that is required for the final steps of division.

=== Division plane specification ===
The second step of animal cell cytokinesis involves division plane specification and cytokinetic furrow formation. Precise positioning of the division plane between the two masses of segregated chromosomes is essential to prevent chromosome loss. Meanwhile, the mechanism by which the spindle determines the division plane in animal cells is perhaps the most enduring mystery in cytokinesis and a matter of intense debate. There exist three hypotheses of furrow induction.

The first is the astral stimulation hypothesis, which postulates that astral microtubules from the spindle poles carry a furrow-inducing signal to the cell cortex, where signals from two poles are somehow focused into a ring at the spindle.

A second possibility, called the central spindle hypothesis, is that the cleavage furrow is induced by a positive stimulus that originates in the central spindle equator. The central spindle may contribute to the specification of the division plane by promoting concentration and activation of the small small GTPase protein RhoA at the equatorial cortex.

A third hypothesis is the astral relaxation hypothesis. It postulates that active actin-myosin bundles are distributed throughout the cell cortex, and inhibition of their contraction near the spindle poles results in a gradient of contractile activity that is highest at the midpoint between poles. In other words, astral microtubules generate a negative signal that increases cortical relaxation close to the poles. Genetic and laser-micromanipulation studies in Caenorhabditis elegans embryos have shown that the spindle sends two redundant signals to the cell cortex, one originating from the central spindle, and a second signal deriving from the spindle aster, suggesting the involvement of multiple mechanisms combined in the positioning of the cleavage furrow. The predominance of one particular signal varies between cell types and organisms. And the multitude and partial redundancy of signals may be required to make the system robust and to increase spatial precision.

=== Actin-myosin ring assembly and contraction ===
At the cytokinesis cleavage furrow, it is the actin-myosin contractile ring that drives the cleavage process, during which cell membrane and wall grow inward, which eventually pinches the mother cell in two. The key components of this ring are the filamentous protein actin and the motor protein myosin II. The contractile ring assembles equatorially (in the middle of the cell) at the cell cortex (adjacent to the cell membrane). Rho protein family (RhoA protein in mammalian cells) is a key regulator of contractile ring formation and contraction in animal cells. The RhoA pathway promotes assembly of the actin-myosin ring by two main effectors.

First, RhoA stimulates nucleation of unbranched actin filaments by activation of Diaphanous-related formins. This local generation of new actin filaments is important for the contractile ring formation. This actin filament formation process also requires a protein called profilin, which binds to actin monomers and helps load them onto the filament end.

Second, RhoA promotes myosin II activation by the kinase ROCK, which activates myosin II directly by phosphorylation of the myosin light chain and also inhibits myosin phosphatase by phosphorylation of the phosphatase-targeting subunit MYPT.

Besides actin and myosin II, the contractile ring contains the scaffolding protein anillin. Anillin binds to actin, myosin, RhoA, and CYK-4, and thereby links the equatorial cortex with the signals from the central spindle. It also contributes to the linkage of the actin-myosin ring to the plasma membrane. Additionally, anillin generates contractile forces by rectifying thermal fluctuations.

Another protein, septin, has also been speculated to serve as a structural scaffold on which the cytokinesis apparatus is organized. Following its assembly, contraction of the actin-myosin ring leads to ingression of the attached plasma membrane, which partitions the cytoplasm into two domains of emerging sister cells. The force for the contractile processes is generated by movements along actin by the motor protein myosin II. Myosin II uses the free energy released when ATP is hydrolyzed to move along these actin filaments, constricting the cell membrane to form a cleavage furrow. Continued hydrolysis causes this cleavage furrow to ingress (move inwards), a striking process that is clearly visible through a light microscope.

=== Abscission ===
The cytokinetic furrow ingresses until a midbody structure (composed of electron-dense, proteinaceous material) is formed, where the actin-myosin ring has reached a diameter of about 1–2 μm. Most animal cell types remain connected by an intercellular cytokinetic bridge for up to several hours until they are split by an actin-independent process termed abscission, the last step of cytokinesis.

The process of abscission physically cleaves the midbody into two. Abscission proceeds by removal of cytoskeletal structures from the cytokinetic bridge, constriction of the cell cortex, and plasma membrane fission. The intercellular bridge is filled with dense bundles of antiparallel microtubules that derive from the central spindle. These microtubules overlap at the midbody, which is generally thought to be a targeting platform for the abscission machinery.

The microtubule severing protein spastin is largely responsible for the disassembly of microtubule bundles inside the intercellular bridge. Complete cortical constriction also requires removal of the underlying cytoskeletal structures. Actin filament disassembly during late cytokinesis depends on the PKCε–14-3-3 complex, which inactivates RhoA after furrow ingression. Actin disassembly is further controlled by the GTPase Rab35 and its effector, the phosphatidylinositol-4,5-bisphosphate 5-phosphatase OCRL. The final step of abscission is controlled by the recruitment and polymerization of the endosomal sorting complex required for transport III (ESCRT-III), which serves to physically constrict and separate the plasma membrane of the two adjoined daughter cells.

=== Timing cytokinesis ===
Cytokinesis must be temporally controlled to ensure that it occurs only after sister chromatids separate during the anaphase portion of normal proliferative cell divisions. To achieve this, many components of the cytokinesis machinery are highly regulated to ensure that they are able to perform a particular function at only a particular stage of the cell cycle. Cytokinesis happens only after APC binds with CDC20. This allows for the separation of chromosomes and myosin to work simultaneously.

After cytokinesis, non-kinetochore microtubules reorganize and disappear into a new cytoskeleton as the cell cycle returns to interphase (see also cell cycle).

== Plant cell ==
Due to the presence of a cell wall, cytokinesis in plant cells is significantly different from that in animal cells, Rather than forming a contractile ring, plant cells construct a cell plate in the middle of the cell. The stages of cell plate formation include (1) creation of the phragmoplast, an array of microtubules that guides and supports the formation of the cell plate; (2) trafficking of vesicles to the division plane and their fusion to generate a tubular-vesicular network; (3) continued fusion of membrane tubules and their transformation into membrane sheets upon the deposition of callose, followed by deposition of cellulose and other cell wall components; (4) recycling of excess membrane and other material from the cell plate; and (5) fusion with the parental cell wall

The phragmoplast is assembled from the remnants of the mitotic spindle, and serves as a track for the trafficking of vesicles to the phragmoplast midzone. These vesicles contain lipids, proteins and carbohydrates needed for the formation of a new cell boundary. Electron tomographic studies have identified the Golgi apparatus as the source of these vesicles, but other studies have suggested that they contain endocytosed material as well.

These tubules then widen and fuse laterally with each other, eventually forming a planar, fenestrated sheet ^{[8]}. As the cell plate matures, large amounts of membrane material are removed via clathrin-mediated endocytosis ^{[7]} Eventually, the edges of the cell plate fuse with the parental plasma membrane, often in an asymmetrical fashion, thus completing cytokinesis. The remaining fenestrae contain strands of endoplasmic reticulum passing through them, and are thought to be the precursors of plasmodesmata ^{[8]}.

The process of Cytokinesis in a plant cell and an animal cell

The construction of the new cell wall begins within the lumen of the narrow tubules of the young cell plate. The order in which different cell wall components are deposited has been determined largely by immuno-electron microscopy. The first components to arrive are pectins, hemicelluloses, and arabinogalactan proteins carried by the secretory vesicles that fuse to form the cell plate. The next component to be added is callose, which is polymerized directly at the cell plate by callose synthases. As the cell plate continues to mature and fuses with the parental plasma membrane, the callose is slowly replaced with cellulose, the primary component of a mature cell wall ^{[6]}. The middle lamella (a glue-like layer containing pectin) develops from the cell plate, serving to bind the cell walls of adjoining cells together.

== Forces ==
=== Animal cells ===
Cytokinetic furrow ingression is powered by Type II Myosin ATPase. Since Myosins are recruited to the medial region, the contractile forces acting on the cortex resemble a 'purse string' constriction pulling inwards. This leads to the inward constriction. The plasma membrane by virtue of its close association with the cortex via crosslinker proteins To the constriction of the cleavage furrow, the total surface area should be increased by supplying the plasma membrane via exocytosis.

Theoretical models show that symmetric constriction requires both lateral stabilization and constriction forces. Reduction of external pressure and of surface tension (by membrane trafficking) reduce the required stabilization and constriction forces.

== Proteins involved in cytokinesis ==
CEP55 is a mitotic phosphoprotein that plays a key role in cytokinesis, the final stage of cell division.

== Clinical significance ==
In some cases, a cell may divide its genetic material and grow in size, but fail to undergo cytokinesis. This results in larger cells with more than one nucleus. Usually this is an unwanted aberration and can be a sign of cancerous cells.

== See also ==
- Diploid – Number of sets of chromosomes of a cell
- Telophase – Final stage of mitosis and meiosis
- Prophase – First phase of mitosis and meiosis
- Anaphase – Fourth stage of mitosis and meiosis
- Metaphase – Third stage of mitosis and meiosis
- Mitosis – Cell division into two identical cells
- Cell theory – Theory that living organisms are made up of cells
- Cytoskeleton – Network of filamentous proteins that forms the internal framework of cells
