= Cytoplast =

A cytoplast is a cellular structure made up of the cytoplasm and plasma membrane, but not a nucleus. It is commonly used in cell biology to describe enucleated cells that retain functional cytoplasmic components. Cytoplasts play a crucial role in Cell fusion, reprogramming, and Somatic cell nuclear transfer or SCNT for short. Recent studies have also shown that cytoplasts from human embryonic stem cells (hESCs) have reprogramming factors that can help turn somatic cells into pluripotent cells(stem cells that can differentiate into any cell type) without needing genetic modifications.

== History ==
The concept of cytoplasts emerged from early studies on cell division and nuclear-cytoplasmic interactions. The term gained popularity in the 1970s and 1980s with advancements in cell fusion techniques and nuclear transfer experiments.

- Early recognition of cytoplasts: The cytoplast concept can be traced back to early studies of organelle biogenesis in eukaryotic cells. The understanding of cellular compartments and their functions grew significantly with the development of Electron microscopy and sub-cellular fractioning techniques. These advancements enabled scientists to isolate and study cytoplasmic components separately from the nucleus.
- Porter and McNiven’s cytoplast concept: In the 1980s, Porter and McNiven introduced the idea that the cytoplasm, even in the absence of a nucleus, functions as an organized “cytoplast”, structured integrated by a Cytoskeleton.
- Somatic Cell Nuclear Transfer (SCNT) and Cloning: Cytoplasts later became central to nuclear reprogramming when it was found that oocyte cytoplasts could reprogram somatic nuclei, leading to successful cloning in the famous Dolly the sheep experiment in 1996. This experiment proved that cytoplasmic factors in enucleated oocytes played a key role in altering nuclear function and resetting cell identity.
- Stem cell research and cytoplast reprogramming: Advances in stem cell research further showed the significance of cytoplasts. It was demonstrated that cytoplasts from hESCs arrested at metaphase contain essential pluripotency factors, enabling reprogramming of somatic cells.
- Organelle biogenesis and cellular organization: Research into organelle inheritance broadened the understanding of cytoplasts, showing that membrane-bound structures like the Golgi Complex, Endoplasmic reticulum, and Mitochondria could function and reorganize within enucleated cells.
- Mechanical properties of cytoplasts: Recent studies indicate that cytoplasts retain mechanical stiffness even after enucleation, suggesting that the Actomyosin cytoskeleton plays a more dominant role in cellular mechanics than previously thought.

These historical developments have established cytoplasts as essential tools in Cell biology, Regenerative medicine, and Cloning, leading to their continued use in many cellular studies.

== Structure ==
=== A cytoplast consists of ===
- Cytoplasm – The fluidic interior containing organelles essential for cellular metabolism.
- Cell membrane – The outer lipid bilayer that maintains cellular integrity.
- Cytoskeleton – A network of Microtubules(MTs), Actin filaments, and intermediate filaments that provides mechanical support and helps in cellular signaling.

=== Types of cytoplasts ===
- Oocyte Cytoplasts – Used in cloning and nuclear transfer experiments.
- Somatic Cytoplasts – Enucleated fibroblasts or other cell types used in fusion experiments.
- Stem cell Cytoplasts – Derived from hESCs at metaphase, containing reprogramming factors.

== Function ==
=== 1. Cellular reprogramming ===
- Cytoplasts from human oocytes or hESCs have been shown to reprogram somatic nuclei into a pluripotent state, avoiding the need for Genetic Modification.
- M-phase cytoplasts from hESCs contain dispersed Oct-4, Nanog, and SOX2, which play a role in nuclear reprogramming.

=== 2. Role in cell division and cytokinesis ===
- In Animal cells, the spindle apparatus during mitosis defines two new cytoplasts, which later become daughter cells.
- In Plant cells, preprophase bands (PPBs) and phragmoplasts predefine cytoplasts, ensuring proper cell division.

=== 3. Cellular mechanics and structural integrity ===
- Recent studies indicate that cytoplasts can retain or even increase stiffness after enucleation, despite the removal of the nucleus, which was traditionally thought to be the stiffest part of the cell.
- Actomyosin cytoskeleton dominates cellular mechanics, suggesting that the actin network plays a larger role in stiffness than the nucleus itself.
- Viscoelastic properties of cytoplasts show that they have higher resistance to deformation and increased dissipative behavior compared to intact cells.
- Cytoplasts are capable of cellular migration, supporting previous findings that enucleated cells can still undergo some normal cellular functions.
- The removal of the nucleus does not soften the cytoplast, indicating that cytoskeletal tension redistributes across remaining cellular structures.
- Nucleoplasts and isolated nuclei are significantly softer than intact cells, reinforcing the idea that the actin network provides greater mechanical stability.

=== 4. Application in cloning and assisted reproduction ===
- Cytoplasts are used in SCNT, where a donor nucleus is fused with an enucleated cytoplast to generate a cloned embryo.
- Cytoplast-based reprogramming offers a potential alternative to induced pluripotent stem cells (iPSCs), avoiding the risks of tumorigenicity.

== Mechanisms of cytoplast function ==
=== 1. Nuclear-cytoplasmic interactions ===
- The cytoplast serves as a regulatory domain, interacting with the nucleus, if it is present, through signaling pathways.
- Epigenetic modifications occur in the transferred nucleus which enables reprogramming.

=== 2. Tensegrity model and cytoskeletal organization ===
- The cytoplast is structured by a Tensegrity system, where actin filaments interact with microtubules.
- This cytoskeletal organization governs cell shape, mechanical stress sensing, and intracellular transport.

=== 3. Cytoplast-mediated reprogramming of somatic cells ===
- Studies have shown that hESC cytoplasts at metaphase contain reprogramming factors, which disperse into the cytoplasm and reprogram fused somatic cells into a pluripotent state.
- Gradient centrifugation is normally used to isolate these cytoplasts for reprogramming applications.

=== 4. Cytoplasts and cellular mechanics ===
- Cytoplasts have a higher Young's modulus and viscosity than a typically enucleated cell which indicates greater mechanical resistance and structural rigidity.
- Enucleation does not disrupt the actin cytoskeleton due to the actomyosin network of cytoplasts.
- Actin stress fibers remain intact in cytoplasts, maintaining cellular shape and stiffness.
- The ability of cytoplasts to maintain mechanical integrity suggests their potential role in mechanotransduction and structural cell behavior.
