= Phycoplast =

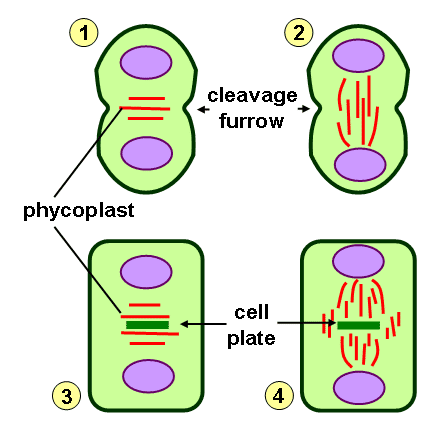
Schematic representation of types of cytokinesis in the green algae: 1) Phycoplast formation with cleavage furrow (e.g. Chlamydomonas); 2) Cleavage furrow and persistent telophase spindle (e.g. Klebsormidium); 3) Phycoplast and cell plate formation (e.g. Fritschiella); 4) Persistent telophase spindle/phragmoplast with cell plate formation (e.g. Coleochaete)

The phycoplast is a microtubule structure observed during cytokinesis in members of the Chlorophytina, the largest and most well known subphylum of chlorophyte green algae.

Cytokinesis in green algae occurs via a diverse range of mechanisms, including cleavage furrows in some algae and cell plates in others. Plants (=Chloroplastida) of the clade Phragmoplastophyta (a subgroup of charophytes which includes the land plants, desmids, water silk, stoneworts etc.) use structures called phragmoplasts to organize and guide the growing cell plate. In these plants, the microtubules of the telophase spindle give rise to the phragmoplast and are oriented perpendicular to the plane of cell division and the forming cell plate. The growth of the cell plate eventually disrupts the telophase spindle (see case 4 in picture).

In the Chlorophyceae, the most common form of cell division occurs via a phycoplast. In these algae, the spindle collapses and a new system of microtubules forms that is oriented in parallel to the plane of cell division. This phycoplast can be observed in algae undergoing cytokinesis via cleavage furrow (case 1 in picture) as well as algae utilizing a cell plate (case 3 in picture). The phycoplast may play a role in assuring that the plane of cell division will pass between the two daughter nuclei. Typically, these algae undergo "closed" mitosis where the nuclear envelope persists throughout mitosis.
