= Synaptonemal complex central element protein 1 =

Protein-coding gene in the species Homo sapiens

SYCE1

Identifiers
- Aliases: SYCE1, C10orf94, CT76, synaptonemal complex central element protein 1, POF12, SPGF15
- External IDs: OMIM: 611486; MGI: 1921325; HomoloGene: 77044; GeneCards: SYCE1; OMA:SYCE1 - orthologs

Gene location (Human)
| Chr. | Chromosome 10 (human) |
| Band | 10q26.3 | Start | 133,553,901 bp |
| Band | 10q26.3 | End | 133,569,835 bp |

Gene location (Mouse)
| Chr. | Chromosome 7 (mouse) |
| Band | 7 F4|7 | Start | 140,357,142 bp |
| Band | 7 F4|7 | End | 140,367,765 bp |
RNA expression pattern
| Bgee | Human / Mouse (ortholog); Top expressed in: right testis; left testis; gonad; right hemisphere of cerebellum; right frontal lobe; testicle; anterior cingulate cortex; Brodmann area 9; prefrontal cortex; nucleus accumbens / Top expressed in: seminiferous tubule; spermatocyte; spermatid; embryo; morula; embryo; zygote; ovary; Gonadal ridge; epiblast; More reference expression data |
| BioGPS | n/a |
Gene ontology
| Molecular function | protein binding |
| Cellular component | synaptonemal complex; central element; nucleus; chromosome |
| Biological process | cell cycle; meiosis; synaptonemal complex organization; synaptonemal complex assembly; cell division |
Sources:Amigo / QuickGO
Orthologs
| Species | Human | Mouse |
| Entrez | 93426 | 74075 |
| Ensembl | ENSG00000171772 | ENSMUSG00000025480 |
| UniProt | Q8N0S2 | Q9D495 |
| RefSeq (mRNA) | NM_201564; NM_001143763; NM_001143764; NM_130784 | NM_001143765 |
| RefSeq (protein) | NP_001137235; NP_570140; NP_001137236 | NP_001137237 |
| Location (UCSC) | Chr 10: 133.55 – 133.57 Mb | Chr 7: 140.36 – 140.37 Mb |
| PubMed search |
- Wikidata
| View/Edit Human | View/Edit Mouse |

Synaptonemal complex central element protein 1 is a protein that in humans is encoded by the SYCE1 gene.

Primary ovarian insufficiency can be caused by mutations in genes involved in essential steps in chromosome synapsis and recombination during meiosis. Mutation in the autosomal gene SYCE1 that encodes synaptonemal complex element 1 protein causes a primary ovarian insufficiency phenotype in humans. This finding highlights the importance of the synaptonemal complex and meiosis for ovarian function.
