= Cell cortex =

Layer on the inner face of a cell membrane

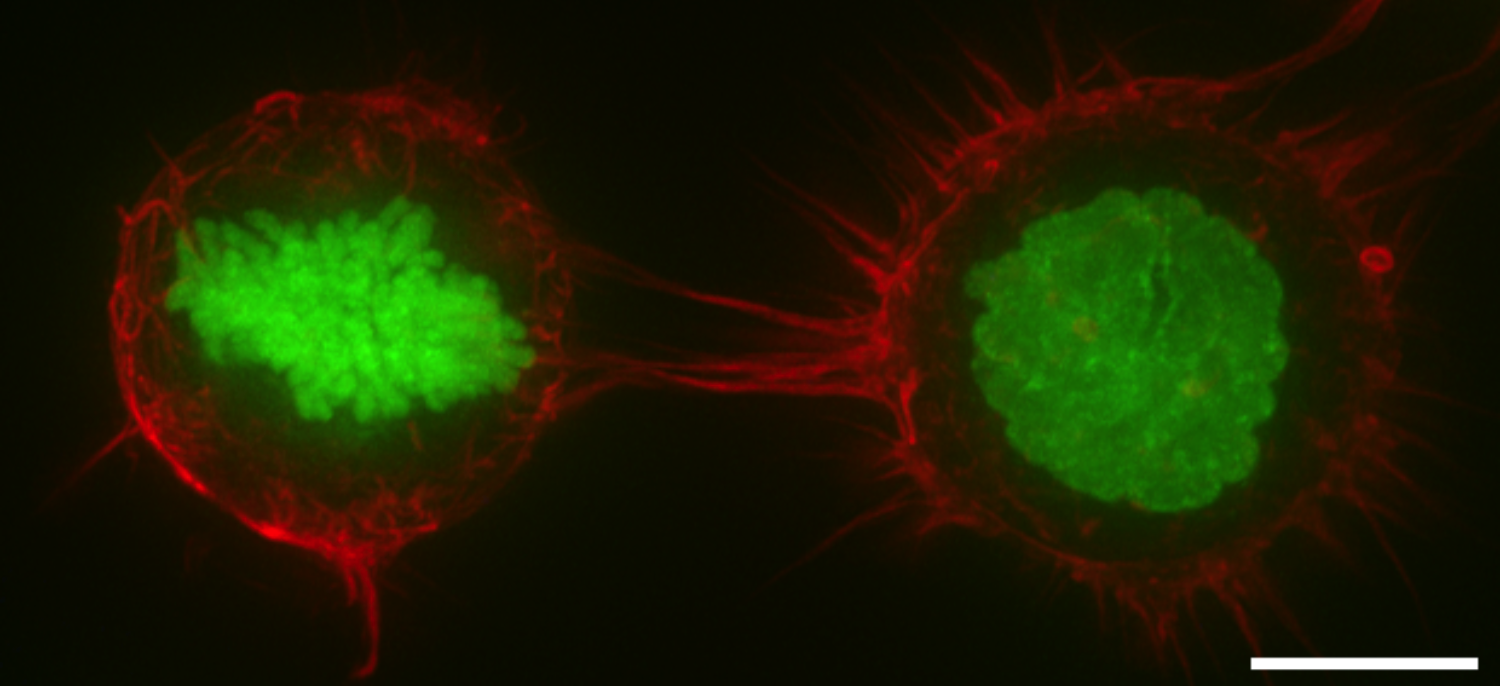
F-actin distribution in the cell cortex as shown by rhodamine phalloidin staining of HeLa cells that constitutively express Histone H2B-GFP to mark chromosomes. F-actin is thus red, while Histone H2B is displayed in green. The left-hand cell is in mitosis, as demonstrated by chromosome condensation, while the right-hand cell is in interphase (as determined by intact cell nucleus) in a suspended state. In both cases, F-actin is enriched around the cell periphery. Scale bar: 10 micrometers.

The cell cortex, also known as the actin cortex, cortical cytoskeleton or actomyosin cortex, is a specialized thin layer of cross-linked actomyosins attached to the cell membrane. In protists this part of the cytoskeleton is also known as the ectoplasm, the outermost part of the cytoplasm, contrasted with endoplasm. It functions as a modulator of membrane behavior and cell surface properties. In most eukaryotic cells lacking a cell wall, the cortex is an actin-rich network consisting of F-actin filaments, myosin motors, and actin-binding proteins. The actomyosin cortex is attached to the cell membrane via membrane-anchoring proteins called ERM proteins that play a central role in cell shape control. The protein constituents of the cortex undergo rapid turnover, making the cortex both mechanically rigid and highly plastic, two properties essential to its function. The mesh size of the cortex varies considerably but is typically in the 100–200 nanometres range.

In some animal cells, the protein spectrin may be present in the cortex. Spectrin helps to create a network by cross-linked actin filaments. The proportions of spectrin and actin vary with cell type. Spectrin proteins and actin microfilaments are attached to transmembrane proteins by attachment proteins between them and the transmembrane proteins. The cell cortex is attached to the inner cytosolic face of the plasma membrane in cells where the spectrin proteins and actin microfilaments form a mesh-like structure that is continuously remodeled by polymerization, depolymerization and branching.

Many proteins are involved in the cortex regulation and dynamics, including formins, with roles in actin polymerization, Arp2/3 complexes that give rise to actin branching and capping proteins. Due to the branching process and the density of the actin cortex, the cortical cytoskeleton can comprise a highly complex meshwork such as a fractal structure. Specialized cells are usually characterized by a very specific cortical actin cytoskeleton. For example, in red blood cells, the cell cortex consists of a two-dimensional cross-linked elastic network with pentagonal or hexagonal symmetry, tethered to the plasma membrane and formed primarily by spectrin, actin and ankyrin. In neuronal axons, the actin or spectric cytoskeleton forms an array of periodic rings and in the sperm flagellum it forms a helical structure.

In plant cells, the cell cortex is reinforced by cortical microtubules underlying the plasma membrane. The direction of these cortical microtubules determines which way the cell elongates when it grows.

== Functions ==
The cortex mainly functions to produce tension under the cell membrane, allowing the cell to change shape. This is primarily accomplished through myosin II motors, which pull on the filaments to generate stress. These changes in tension are required for the cell to change its shape as it undergoes cell migration and cell division.

In mitosis, F-actin and myosin II form a highly contractile and uniform cortex to drive mitotic cell rounding. The surface tension produced by the actomyosin cortex activity generates intracellular hydrostatic pressure capable of displacing surrounding objects to facilitate rounding. Thus, the cell cortex serves to protect the microtubule spindle from external mechanical disruption during mitosis. When external forces are applied at sufficiently large rate and magnitude to a mitotic cell, loss of cortical F-actin homogeneity occurs leading to herniation of blebs and a temporary loss of the ability to protect the mitotic spindle. Genetic studies have shown that the cell cortex in mitosis is regulated by diverse genes such as Rhoa, WDR1, ERM proteins, Ect2, Pbl, Cdc42, aPKC, Par6, DJ-1 and FAM134A.

In cytokinesis the cell cortex plays a central role by producing a myosin-rich contractile ring to constrict the dividing cell into two daughter cells.

Cell cortex contractility is key for amoeboidal type cell migration characteristic of many cancer cell metastasis events.

In addition to cell cortex also plays essential roles in the formation of tissues, organs and organisms. By pulling on adhesion complexes, the cortex promotes the expansion of contacts with other cells or with the extracellular matrix. Notably, during early mammalian development, the cortex pulls cells together to drive compaction and the formation of the morula. Also, differences in cortical tension drives the sorting of the inner cell mass and trophectoderm progenitors during the formation of the morula, the sorting of germ layer progenitors during zebrafish gastrulation, the invagination of the mesoderm and the elongation of the germ band elongation during drosophila gastrulation.

== Research ==
Basic research into the cell cortex is done with immortalised cell lines, typically HeLa cells, S2 cells, Normal rat kidney cells, and M2 cells. In M2 cells in particular, cellular blebs – which form without a cortex, then form one as they retract – are often used to model cortex formation and composition.
