= SYCP3 =

Protein-coding gene in the species Homo sapiens

Available structures
PDB	Ortholog search: PDBe RCSB
PDB	List of PDB id codes 4CPC

Identifiers
- Aliases: SYCP3, COR1, SCP3, SPGF4, RPRGL4, synaptonemal complex protein 3
- External IDs: OMIM: 604759; MGI: 109542; HomoloGene: 7964; GeneCards: SYCP3; OMA:SYCP3 - orthologs

Gene location (Human)
Chr.	Chromosome 12 (human)
Band	12q23.2	Start	101,728,648 bp
Band	12q23.2	End	101,739,472 bp

Gene location (Mouse)
Chr.	Chromosome 10 (mouse)
Band	10|10 C1	Start	88,295,431 bp
Band	10|10 C1	End	88,309,098 bp
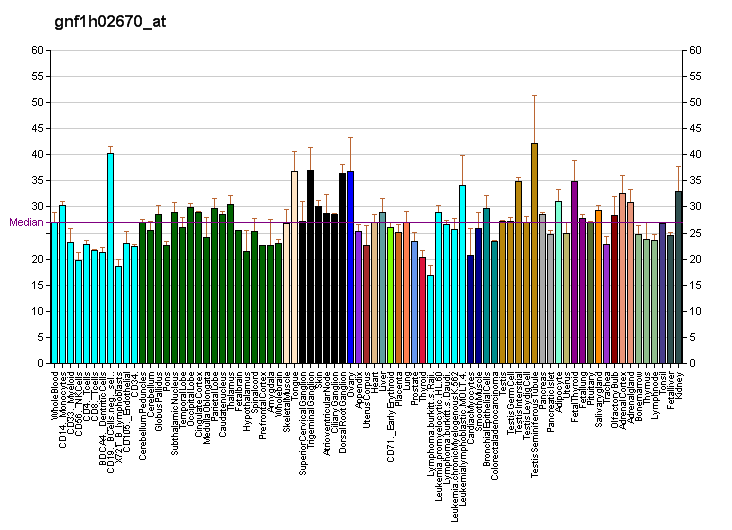

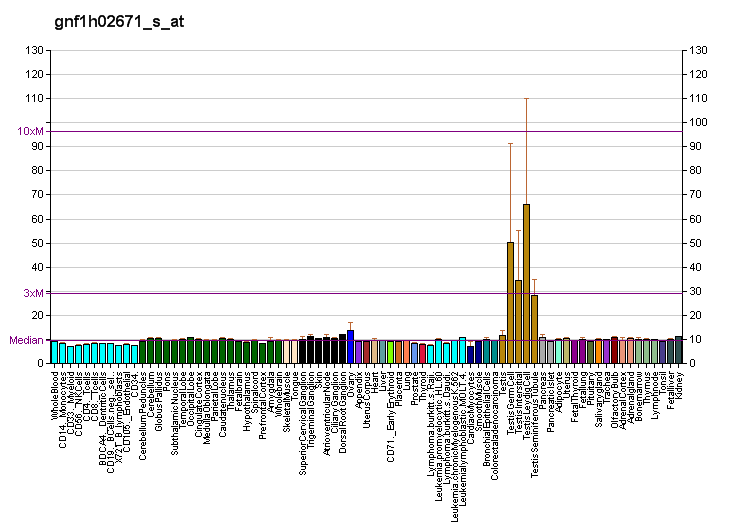
RNA expression pattern
Bgee	Human / Mouse (ortholog); Top expressed in: right testis; left testis; secondary oocyte; gonad; sperm; testicle; buccal mucosa cell; stromal cell of endometrium; mucosa of transverse colon; Achilles tendon / Top expressed in: seminiferous tubule; spermatocyte; spermatid; ascending aorta; zygote; aortic valve; epithelium of small intestine; Gonadal ridge; brown adipose tissue; secondary oocyte; More reference expression data
BioGPS	More reference expression data
Gene ontology
Molecular function	DNA binding
Cellular component	nucleus; chromosome; synaptonemal complex; lateral element; chromosome, centromeric region
Biological process	cell cycle; male meiosis I; cell division; meiosis; spermatogenesis; spermatid development
Sources:Amigo / QuickGO
Orthologs
Species	Human	Mouse
Entrez	50511	20962
Ensembl	ENSG00000139351	ENSMUSG00000020059
UniProt	Q8IZU3	P70281
RefSeq (mRNA)	NM_001177948; NM_001177949; NM_153694	NM_011517
RefSeq (protein)	NP_001171419; NP_001171420; NP_710161	NP_035647
Location (UCSC)	Chr 12: 101.73 – 101.74 Mb	Chr 10: 88.3 – 88.31 Mb
PubMed search
- Wikidata
View/Edit Human	View/Edit Mouse

Synaptonemal complex protein 3 is a protein that in humans is encoded by the SYCP3 gene. It is a component of the synaptonemal complex formed between homologous chromosomes during the prophase of meiosis.

== Gene family ==
XLR/SYCP3/FAM9 domain

Identifiers
- Symbol: Cor1
- Pfam: PF04803
- InterPro: IPR006888
- CATH: 4cpc
Available protein structures:
- Pfam: structures / ECOD
- PDB: RCSB PDB; PDBe; PDBj
- PDBsum: structure summary

SYCP3 is also known as COR1. It contains a conserved coiled-coil domain that is also found in the FAM9 (FAM9A, FAM9B) family of proteins, found on the human X chromosome.

Several SYCP3-like proteins are found on mice sex chromosomes. They are assigned names starting with Slx or Sly depending on the chromosome they are linked to. Slx/Slxl1 and Sly are neofunctionalized ones that have opposite effects on gene expression and epigenetic modifications, and each gene reduces the viability and mobility (via spindlin binding) of sperms containing the other sex chromosome, tilting the sex ratio to their own favor. Over time they are duplicated to balance out each other's effects.
