= CEP70 =

Protein-coding gene in the species Homo sapiens

Identifiers
- Aliases: CEP70, BITE, centrosomal protein 70
- External IDs: OMIM: 614310; MGI: 1915371; HomoloGene: 11387; GeneCards: CEP70; OMA:CEP70 - orthologs

Gene location (Human)
Chr.	Chromosome 3 (human)
Band	3q22.3	Start	138,494,344 bp
Band	3q22.3	End	138,594,538 bp

Gene location (Mouse)
Chr.	Chromosome 9 (mouse)
Band	9|9 E3.3	Start	99,243,367 bp
Band	9|9 E3.3	End	99,300,404 bp
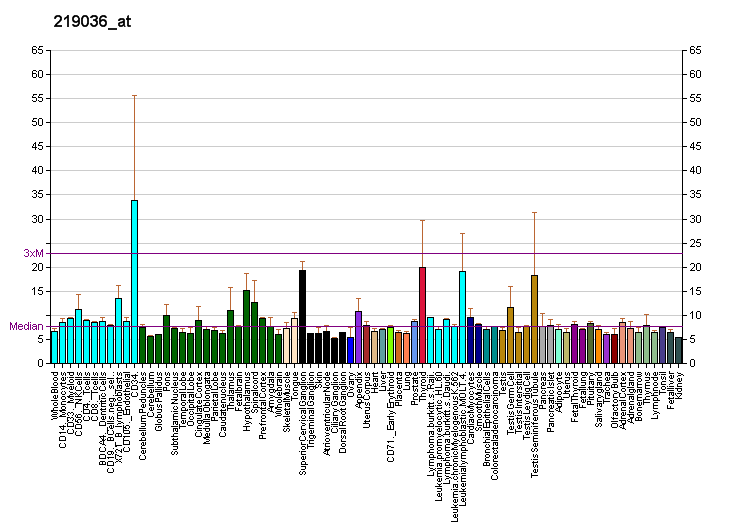
RNA expression pattern
Bgee	Human / Mouse (ortholog); Top expressed in: Achilles tendon; sperm; right uterine tube; ventricular zone; left testis; right testis; ganglionic eminence; body of pancreas; duodenum; jejunal mucosa / Top expressed in: zygote; secondary oocyte; spermatocyte; genital tubercle; primary oocyte; trigeminal ganglion; substantia nigra; saccule; ventricular zone; ganglionic eminence; More reference expression data
BioGPS	More reference expression data
Gene ontology
Molecular function	protein binding; identical protein binding; gamma-tubulin binding
Cellular component	microtubule organizing center; cytoskeleton; cytoplasm; nucleoplasm; cytosol; nuclear membrane; centrosome
Biological process	G2/M transition of mitotic cell cycle; ciliary basal body-plasma membrane docking; regulation of G2/M transition of mitotic cell cycle; cilium assembly; regulation of microtubule cytoskeleton organization
Sources:Amigo / QuickGO
Orthologs
Species	Human	Mouse
Entrez	80321	68121
Ensembl	ENSG00000114107	ENSMUSG00000056267
UniProt	Q8NHQ1	Q6IQY5
RefSeq (mRNA)	NM_001288964; NM_001288965; NM_001288966; NM_001288967; NM_024491 NM_001320598; NM_001320599; NM_001320600	NM_023873
RefSeq (protein)	NP_001275893; NP_001275894; NP_001275895; NP_001275896; NP_001307527 NP_001307528; NP_001307529; NP_077817	NP_076362
Location (UCSC)	Chr 3: 138.49 – 138.59 Mb	Chr 9: 99.24 – 99.3 Mb
PubMed search
- Wikidata
View/Edit Human	View/Edit Mouse

Centrosomal protein of 70 kDa is a protein that in humans is encoded by the CEP70 gene. The protein interacts with γ-tubulin through its coiled coil domains to localize at the centrosome. CEP70 is involved in organizing microtubules in interphase cells and is required for proper organization and orientation of the mitotic spindle.
