= Cytoplasmic hybrid =

Animal view of different embryos developing in Xenopus laevis eggs: haploid [laevis]x laevis (middle) and [laevis]x tropicalis cybrid (bottom) embryos cleave and begin gastrulation synchronously, about 50 minutes after diploid laevis x laevis (top) embryos. A star was added to the right of embryos at the onset of gastrulation (stage 10), when embryo-wide cellular movements begin.

A cytoplasmic hybrid (or cybrid, a portmanteau of the two words) is a eukaryotic cell line produced by the fusion of a whole cell with a cytoplast. Cytoplasts are enucleated cells. This enucleation can be effected by simultaneous application of centrifugal force and treatment of the cell with an agent that disrupts the cytoskeleton. A special case of cybrid formation involves the use of rho-zero cells as the whole cell partner in the fusion. Rho-zero cells are cells which have been depleted of their own mitochondrial DNA by prolonged incubation with ethidium bromide, a chemical which inhibits mitochondrial DNA replication. The rho-zero cells do retain mitochondria and can grow in rich culture medium with certain supplements. They do retain their own nuclear genome. A cybrid is then a hybrid cell which mixes the nuclear genes from one cell with the mitochondrial genes from another cell. Using this powerful tool, it makes it possible to dissociate contribution from the mitochondrial genes vs that of the nuclear genes.

Cybrids are valuable in mitochondrial research and have been used to provide suggestive evidence of mitochondrial involvement in Alzheimer's disease, Parkinson's disease, and other conditions.

== Legal status in United Kingdom ==
Research utilizing cybrid embryos has been hotly contested due to the ethical implications of further cybrid research. In 2008, the House of Lords passed the Human Fertilisation and Embryology Act 2008, which allows the creation of mixed human-animal embryos for medical purposes only. Such cybrids are 99.9% human and 0.1% animal. A cybrid may be kept for a maximum of 14 days, owing to the development of the brain and spinal cord, after which time the cybrid must be destroyed. During the two-week period, stem cells may be harvested from the cybrid, for research or medical purposes. Under no circumstances may a cybrid be implanted into a human uterus.
