= Preprophase =

Cell cycle phase only found in plants

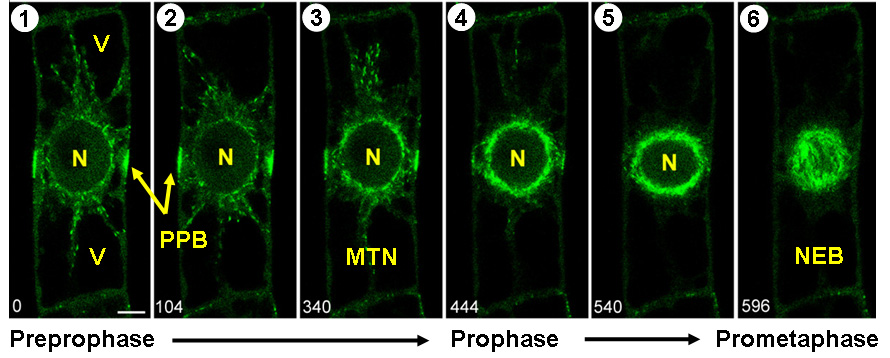
Microtubule dynamics during preprophase and prophase in plant cell mitosis, modified from Donukshe et al. The images follow a tobacco BY-2 cell through the first stages of mitosis (c. 12 minutes). The growing ends of microtubules are shown in green (labeled with green fluorescent protein fused to the microtubule plus end binding protein EB1 of Arabidopsis thaliana). N = Nucleus, V = Vacuole, PPB = Preprophase band, MTN = Microtubule nucleation starts at the nuclear envelope, NEB = Nuclear envelope breakdown at the onset of prometaphase. Also see the movie corresponding to this figure.

Preprophase is an additional phase during mitosis in plant cells that does not occur in other eukaryotes such as animals or fungi. It precedes prophase and is characterized by two distinct events:

1. The formation of the preprophase band, a dense microtubule ring underneath the plasma membrane.
2. The initiation of microtubule nucleation at the nuclear envelope.

== Function of preprophase in the cell cycle ==
Plant cells are fixed with regards to their neighbor cells within the tissues they are growing in. In contrast to animals where certain cells can migrate within the embryo to form new tissues, the seedlings of higher plants grow entirely based on the orientation of cell division and subsequent elongation and differentiation of cells within their cell walls. Therefore, the accurate control of cell division planes and placement of the future cell wall in plant cells is crucial for the correct architecture of plant tissues and organs.

The preprophase stage of somatic plant cell mitosis serves to establish the precise location of the division plane and future cell wall before the cell enters prophase. This is achieved through the formation of a transient microtubule structure, the preprophase band, and a so far unknown mechanism by which the cell is able to "memorize" the position of the preprophase band to guide the new cell wall growing during cytokinesis to the correct location. In gametophyte tissues during the reproductive phase of the plant life cycle, cell division planes may be established without the use of a preprophase band.

In highly vacuolated plant cells, preprophase may be preceded by the formation of a phragmosome. The function of the phragmosome is to suspend the cell nucleus in the center of the cell in preparation for mitosis. If a phragmosome is visible, the preprophase band will appear at its outer edge.

== Preprophase band formation ==
At the beginning of preprophase, the cortical microtubules of a plant cell disappear and aggregate into a dense ring underneath the plasma membrane. This preprophase band runs around the equatorial plane of the future mitotic spindle and marks the plane of cell division and future fusion site for the cell plate. It consists of microtubules and microfilaments (actin) and persists into prophase. Spindle formation occurs during prophase with the axis perpendicular to the plane surrounded by the preprophase band.

== Microtubule nucleation ==
In contrast to animal cells, plant cells do not possess centrosomes to organize their mitotic spindles. Instead, the nuclear envelope acts as a microtubule organizing center (MTOC) for spindle formation during preprophase. The first sign is a clear, actin-free zone appearing around the nuclear envelope. This zone fills with microtubules nucleating on the surface of the nucleus. The preprophase spindle forms by self-assembly of these microtubules in the cytoplasm surrounding the nuclear envelope. It is reinforced through chromosome (kinetochore)-mediated spindle assembly after the nuclear envelope breaks down at the beginning of prometaphase.

== Transition into prophase ==
During progression from preprophase into prophase, the randomly oriented microtubules align parallel along the nuclear surface according to the spindle axis. This structure is called the prophase spindle. Triggered by nuclear membrane breakdown at the beginning of prometaphase, the preprophase band disappears and the prophase spindle matures into the metaphase spindle occupying the space of the former nucleus. Experiments with drugs destroying microfilaments indicate that actin may play a role in keeping the cellular "memory" of the position of the division plane after the preprophase band breaks down to direct cytokinesis in telophase.

== Bibliography ==
- P.H. Raven, R.F. Evert, S.E. Eichhorn (2005): Biology of Plants, 7th Edition, W.H. Freeman and Company Publishers, New York, ISBN 0-7167-1007-2
