= Mitosis =

Cell division into two identical cells

Mitosis in the animal cell cycle (phases ordered counter-clockwise).

Mitosis (/maɪˈtoʊsɪs/) is a part of the cell cycle in eukaryotic cells in which replicated chromosomes are separated into two new nuclei. Cell division by mitosis is an equational division which gives rise to genetically identical cells in which the total number of chromosomes is maintained. Mitosis is preceded by the S phase of interphase (during which DNA replication occurs) and is followed by telophase and cytokinesis, which divide the cytoplasm, organelles, and cell membrane of one cell into two new cells containing roughly equal shares of these cellular components. This process ensures that each daughter cell receives an identical set of chromosomes, maintaining genetic stability across cell generations. The different stages of mitosis altogether define the mitotic phase (M phase) of a cell cycle—the division of the mother cell into two daughter cells genetically identical to each other.

The process of mitosis is divided into stages corresponding to the completion of one set of activities and the start of the next. These stages are preprophase (specific to plant cells), prophase, prometaphase, metaphase, anaphase, and telophase. During mitosis, the chromosomes, which have already duplicated during interphase, condense and attach to spindle fibers that pull one copy of each chromosome to opposite sides of the cell. The result is two genetically identical daughter nuclei. The rest of the cell may then continue to divide by cytokinesis to produce two daughter cells. The different phases of mitosis can be visualized in real time, using live cell imaging.

An error in mitosis can result in the production of three or more daughter cells instead of the normal two. This is called tripolar mitosis and multipolar mitosis, respectively. These errors can be the cause of non-viable embryos that fail to implant. Other errors during mitosis can induce mitotic catastrophe, apoptosis (programmed cell death) or cause mutations. Certain types of cancers can arise from such mutations.

Mitosis varies between organisms. For example, animal cells generally undergo an open mitosis, where the nuclear envelope breaks down before the chromosomes separate, whereas fungal cells generally undergo a closed mitosis, where chromosomes divide within an intact cell nucleus. Most animal cells undergo a shape change, known as mitotic cell rounding, to adopt a near spherical morphology at the start of mitosis. Most human cells are produced by mitotic cell division. Important exceptions include the gametes – sperm and egg cells – which are produced by meiosis. Prokaryotes, bacteria and archaea which lack a true nucleus, divide by a different process called binary fission.

== Discovery ==
Numerous descriptions of cell division were made during 18th and 19th centuries, with various degrees of accuracy. In 1835, the German botanist Hugo von Mohl, described cell division in the green algae Cladophora glomerata, stating that multiplication of cells occurs through cell division. In 1838, Matthias Jakob Schleiden affirmed that "formation of new cells in their interior was a general rule for cell multiplication in plants", a view later rejected in favour of Mohl's model, due to contributions of Robert Remak and others.

In animal cells, cell division with mitosis was discovered in frog, rabbit, and cat cornea cells in 1873 and described for the first time by the Polish histologist Wacław Mayzel in 1875.

Bütschli, Schneider and Fol might have also claimed the discovery of the process presently known as "mitosis". In 1873, the German zoologist Otto Bütschli published data from observations on nematodes. A few years later, he discovered and described mitosis based on those observations.

The term "mitosis", coined by Walther Flemming in 1882, is derived from the Greek word μίτος (mitos, "warp thread"). There are some alternative names for the process, e.g., "karyokinesis" (nuclear division), a term introduced by Schleicher in 1878, or "equational division", proposed by August Weismann in 1887. However, the term "mitosis" is also used in a broad sense by some authors to refer to karyokinesis and cytokinesis together. Presently, "equational division" is more commonly used to refer to meiosis II, the part of meiosis most like mitosis.

== Phases ==
=== Overview ===
Time-lapse video of mitosis in a Drosophila melanogaster embryo

The primary result of mitosis and cytokinesis is the transfer of a parent cell's genome into two daughter cells. The genome is composed of a number of chromosomes—complexes of tightly coiled DNA that contain genetic information vital for proper cell function. Because each resultant daughter cell should be genetically identical to the parent cell, the parent cell must make a copy of each chromosome before mitosis. This occurs during the S phase of interphase. Chromosome duplication results in two identical sister chromatids bound together by cohesin proteins at the centromere.

When mitosis begins, the chromosomes condense and become visible. In some eukaryotes, for example animals, the nuclear envelope, which segregates the DNA from the cytoplasm, disintegrates into small vesicles. The nucleolus, which makes ribosomes in the cell, also disappears. Microtubules project from opposite ends of the cell, attach to the centromeres, and align the chromosomes centrally within the cell. The microtubules then contract to pull the sister chromatids of each chromosome apart. Sister chromatids at this point are called daughter chromosomes. As the cell elongates, corresponding daughter chromosomes are pulled toward opposite ends of the cell and condense maximally in late anaphase. A new nuclear envelope forms around each set of daughter chromosomes, which decondense to form interphase nuclei.

During mitotic progression, typically after the anaphase onset, the cell may undergo cytokinesis. In animal cells, a cell membrane pinches inward between the two developing nuclei to produce two new cells. In plant cells, a cell plate forms between the two nuclei. Cytokinesis does not always occur; coenocytic (a type of multinucleate condition) cells undergo mitosis without cytokinesis.

Diagram of interphase and the following five mitotic stages of the M phase including cytokinesis.

=== Interphase ===
The interphase is a much longer phase of the cell cycle than the relatively short M phase. During interphase the cell prepares itself for the process of cell division. Interphase is divided into three subphases: G_{1} (first gap), S (synthesis), and G_{2} (second gap). During all three parts of interphase, the cell grows by producing proteins and cytoplasmic organelles. However, chromosomes are replicated only during the S phase. Thus, a cell grows (G_{1}), continues to grow as it duplicates its chromosomes (S), grows more and prepares for mitosis (G_{2}), and finally divides (M) before restarting the cycle. All these phases in the cell cycle are highly regulated by cyclins, cyclin-dependent kinases, and other cell cycle proteins. The phases follow one another in strict order and there are cell cycle checkpoints that give the cell cues to proceed or not, from one phase to another. Cells may also temporarily or permanently leave the cell cycle and enter G_{0} phase to stop dividing. This can occur when cells become overcrowded (density-dependent inhibition) or when they differentiate to carry out specific functions for the organism, as is the case for human heart muscle cells and neurons. Some G_{0} cells have the ability to re-enter the cell cycle.

DNA double-strand breaks can be repaired during interphase by two principal processes. The first process, non-homologous end joining (NHEJ), can join the two broken ends of DNA in the G1, S and G2 phases of interphase. The second process, homologous recombinational repair (HRR), is more accurate than NHEJ in repairing double-strand breaks. HRR is active during the S and G2 phases of interphase when DNA replication is either partially accomplished or after it is completed, since HRR requires two adjacent homologs.

Interphase helps prepare the cell for mitotic division. It dictates whether the mitotic cell division will occur. It carefully stops the cell from proceeding whenever the cell's DNA is damaged or has not completed an important phase. The interphase is very important as it will determine if mitosis completes successfully. It will reduce the amount of damaged cells produced and the production of cancerous cells. A miscalculation by the key Interphase proteins could be crucial as the latter could potentially create cancerous cells.

=== Mitosis ===
Stages of early mitosis in a vertebrate cell with micrographs of chromatids

==== Preprophase (plant cells) ====
In plant cells only, prophase is preceded by a preprophase stage. In highly vacuolated plant cells, the nucleus has to migrate into the center of the cell before mitosis can begin. This is achieved through the formation of a phragmosome, a transverse sheet of cytoplasm that bisects the cell along the future plane of cell division. In addition to phragmosome formation, preprophase is characterized by the formation of a ring of microtubules and actin filaments (called preprophase band) underneath the plasma membrane around the equatorial plane of the future mitotic spindle. This band marks the position where the cell will eventually divide. The cells of higher plants (such as the flowering plants) lack centrioles; instead, microtubules form a spindle on the surface of the nucleus and are then organized into a spindle by the chromosomes themselves, after the nuclear envelope breaks down. The preprophase band disappears during nuclear envelope breakdown and spindle formation in prometaphase.

==== Prophase ====
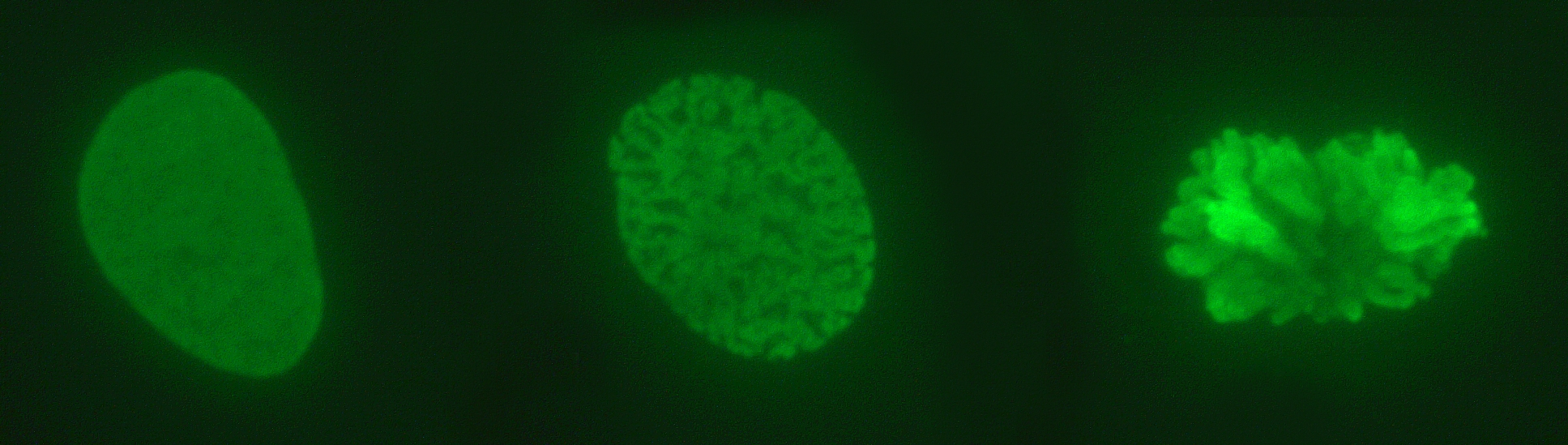
Interphase nucleus (left), condensing chromosomes (middle) and condensed chromosomes (right)

Prophase during mitosis

During prophase, which occurs after G_{2} interphase, the cell prepares to divide by tightly condensing its chromosomes and initiating mitotic spindle formation. During interphase, the genetic material in the nucleus consists of loosely packed chromatin. At the onset of prophase, chromatin fibers condense into discrete chromosomes that are typically visible at high magnification through a light microscope. In this stage, chromosomes are long, thin, and thread-like. Each chromosome has two chromatids. The two chromatids are joined at the centromere.

Gene transcription ceases during prophase and does not resume until late anaphase to early G_{1} phase. The nucleolus also disappears during early prophase.

Close to the nucleus of an animal cell are structures called centrosomes, consisting of a pair of centrioles surrounded by a loose collection of proteins. The centrosome is the coordinating center for the cell's microtubules. A cell inherits a single centrosome at cell division, which is duplicated by the cell before a new round of mitosis begins, giving a pair of centrosomes. The two centrosomes polymerize tubulin to help form a microtubule spindle apparatus. Motor proteins then push the centrosomes along these microtubules to opposite sides of the cell. Although centrosomes help organize microtubule assembly, they are not essential for the formation of the spindle apparatus, since they are absent from plants, and are not absolutely required for animal cell mitosis.

==== Prometaphase ====
At the beginning of prometaphase in animal cells, phosphorylation of nuclear lamins causes the nuclear envelope to disintegrate into small membrane vesicles. As this happens, microtubules invade the nuclear space. This is called open mitosis, and it occurs in some multicellular organisms. Fungi and some protists, such as algae or trichomonads, undergo a variation called closed mitosis where the spindle forms inside the nucleus, or the microtubules penetrate the intact nuclear envelope.

In late prometaphase, kinetochore microtubules begin to search for and attach to chromosomal kinetochores. A kinetochore is a proteinaceous microtubule-binding structure that forms on the chromosomal centromere during late prophase. A number of polar microtubules find and interact with corresponding polar microtubules from the opposite centrosome to form the mitotic spindle. Although the kinetochore structure and function are not fully understood, it is known that it contains some form of molecular motor. When a microtubule connects with the kinetochore, the motor activates, using energy from ATP to "crawl" up the tube toward the originating centrosome. This motor activity, coupled with polymerisation and depolymerisation of microtubules, provides the pulling force necessary to later separate the chromosome's two chromatids.

==== Metaphase ====
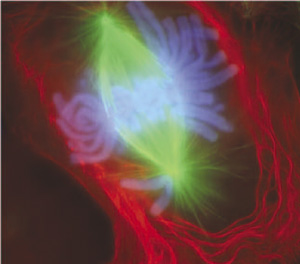
A cell in late metaphase. All chromosomes (blue) but one have arrived at the metaphase plate.

Metaphase during mitosis

After the microtubules have located and attached to the kinetochores in prometaphase, the two centrosomes begin pulling the chromosomes towards opposite ends of the cell. The resulting tension causes the chromosomes to align along the metaphase plate at the equatorial plane, an imaginary line that is centrally located between the two centrosomes (at approximately the midline of the cell). To ensure equitable distribution of chromosomes at the end of mitosis, the metaphase checkpoint guarantees that kinetochores are properly attached to the mitotic spindle and that the chromosomes are aligned along the metaphase plate. If the cell successfully passes through the metaphase checkpoint, it proceeds to anaphase.

==== Anaphase ====
Anaphase during mitosis

During anaphase A, the cohesins that bind sister chromatids together are cleaved, forming two identical daughter chromosomes. Shortening of the kinetochore microtubules pulls the newly formed daughter chromosomes to opposite ends of the cell. During anaphase B, polar microtubules push against each other, causing the cell to elongate. In late anaphase, chromosomes also reach their overall maximal condensation level, to help chromosome segregation and the re-formation of the nucleus. In most animal cells, anaphase A precedes anaphase B, but some vertebrate egg cells demonstrate the opposite order of events.

==== Telophase ====
Telophase during mitosis

Telophase (from the Greek word τελος meaning "end") is a reversal of prophase and prometaphase events. During telophase, the polar microtubules continue to lengthen, elongating the cell even more. If the nuclear envelope has broken down, a new nuclear envelope forms using the membrane vesicles of the parent cell's old nuclear envelope. The new envelope forms around each set of separated daughter chromosomes (though the membrane does not enclose the centrosomes) and the nucleolus reappears. Both sets of chromosomes, now surrounded by new nuclear membrane, begin to "relax" or decondense. Mitosis is complete. Each daughter nucleus has an identical set of chromosomes. Cell division may or may not occur at this time depending on the organism.

=== Cytokinesis ===
Cytokinesis illustration

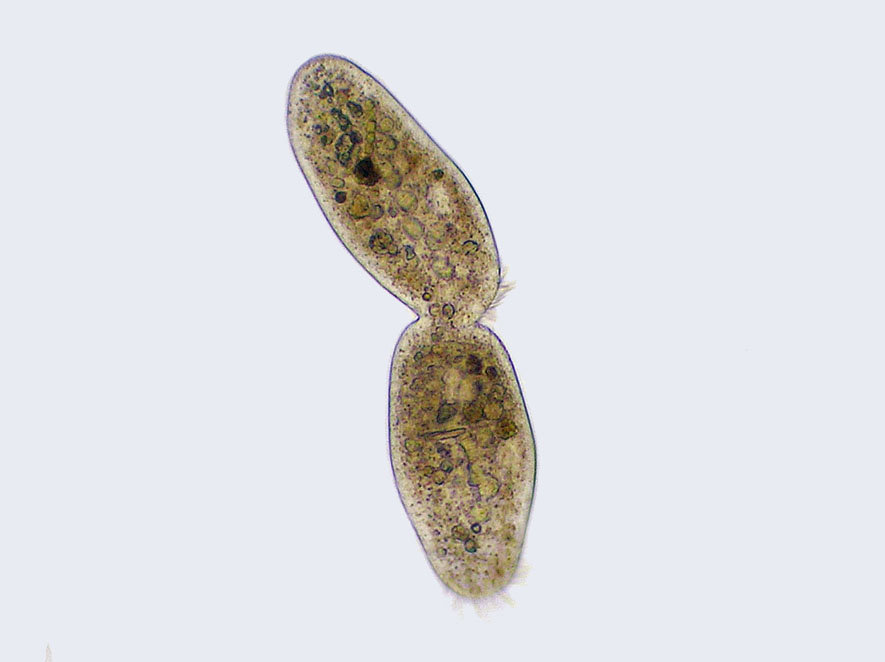
Ciliate undergoing cytokinesis, with the cleavage furrow being clearly visible

Cytokinesis is not a phase of mitosis, but rather a separate process necessary for completing cell division. In animal cells, a cleavage furrow (pinch) containing a contractile ring, develops where the metaphase plate used to be, pinching off the separated nuclei. In both animal and plant cells, cell division is also driven by vesicles derived from the Golgi apparatus, which move along microtubules to the middle of the cell. In plants, this structure coalesces into a cell plate at the center of the phragmoplast and develops into a cell wall, separating the two nuclei. The phragmoplast is a microtubule structure typical for higher plants, whereas some green algae use a phycoplast microtubule array during cytokinesis. Each daughter cell has a complete copy of the genome of its parent cell. The end of cytokinesis marks the end of the M-phase.

There are many cells where mitosis and cytokinesis occur separately, forming single cells with multiple nuclei. The most notable occurrence of this is among the fungi, slime molds, and coenocytic algae, but the phenomenon is found in various other organisms. Even in animals, cytokinesis and mitosis may occur independently, for instance during certain stages of fruit fly embryonic development.

== Function ==
The function or significance of mitosis, is the maintenance of the chromosomal set; each formed cell receives chromosomes that are alike in composition and equal in number to the chromosomes of the parent cell.

Mitosis occurs in the following circumstances:

- Development and growth: The number of cells within an organism increases by mitosis. This is the basis of the development of a multicellular body from a single cell, i.e., zygote and also the basis of the growth of a multicellular body.
- Cell replacement: In some parts of the body, e.g. skin and digestive tract, cells are constantly sloughed off and replaced by new ones. New cells are formed by mitosis and so are exact copies of the cells being replaced. In like manner, red blood cells have a short lifespan (only about 3 months) and new RBCs are formed by mitosis.
- Regeneration: Some organisms can regenerate body parts. The production of new cells in such instances is achieved by mitosis. For example, starfish regenerate lost arms through mitosis.
- Asexual reproduction: Some organisms produce genetically similar offspring through asexual reproduction. For example, the hydra reproduces asexually by budding. The cells at the surface of hydra undergo mitosis and form a mass called a bud. Mitosis continues in the cells of the bud and this grows into a new individual. The same division happens during asexual reproduction or vegetative propagation in plants.

== Variations ==
=== Forms of mitosis ===
The mitosis process in the cells of eukaryotic organisms follows a similar pattern, but with variations in three main details. "Closed" and "open" mitosis can be distinguished on the basis of nuclear envelope remaining intact or breaking down. An intermediate form with partial degradation of the nuclear envelope is called "semiopen" mitosis. With respect to the symmetry of the spindle apparatus during metaphase, an approximately axially symmetric (centered) shape is called "orthomitosis", distinguished from the eccentric spindles of "pleuromitosis", in which mitotic apparatus has bilateral symmetry. Finally, a third criterion is the location of the central spindle in case of closed pleuromitosis: "extranuclear" (spindle located in the cytoplasm) or "intranuclear" (in the nucleus).

closed
intranuclear
pleuromitosis

closed
extranuclear
pleuromitosis

closed
orthomitosis

semiopen
pleuromitosis

semiopen
orthomitosis

open
orthomitosis

Nuclear division takes place only in cells of organisms of the eukaryotic domain, as bacteria and archaea have no nucleus. Bacteria and archaea undergo a different type of division. Within each of the eukaryotic supergroups, mitosis of the open form can be found, as well as closed mitosis, except for unicellular Excavata, which show exclusively closed mitosis. Following, the occurrence of the forms of mitosis in eukaryotes:

- Closed intranuclear pleuromitosis is typical of Foraminifera, some Prasinomonadida, some Kinetoplastida, the Oxymonadida, the Haplosporidia, many fungi (chytrids, oomycetes, zygomycetes, ascomycetes), and some Radiolaria (Spumellaria and Acantharia); it seems to be the most primitive type.
- Closed extranuclear pleuromitosis occurs in Trichomonadida and Dinoflagellata.
- Closed orthomitosis is found among diatoms, ciliates, some Microsporidia, unicellular yeasts and some multicellular fungi.
- Semiopen pleuromitosis is typical of most Apicomplexa.
- Semiopen orthomitosis occurs with different variants in some amoebae (Lobosa) and some green flagellates (e.g., Raphidophyta or Volvox).
- Open orthomitosis is typical in mammals and other Metazoa, and in land plants; but it also occurs in some protists.

=== Errors and other variations ===
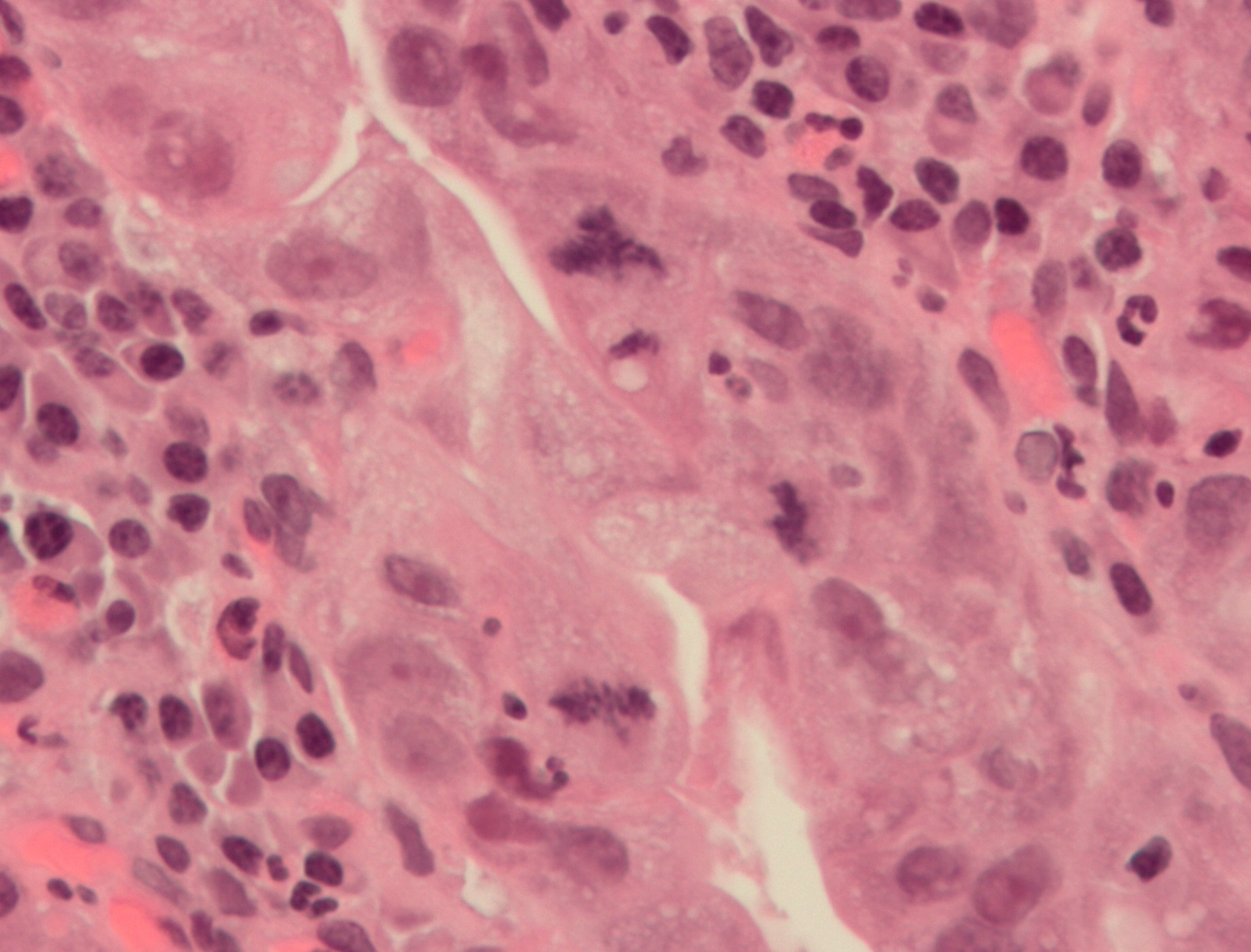
An abnormal (tripolar) mitosis (12 o'clock position) in a precancerous lesion of the stomach (H&E stain)

Errors can occur during mitosis, especially during early embryonic development in humans. During each step of mitosis, there are normally checkpoints as well that control the normal outcome of mitosis. But, occasionally to almost rarely, mistakes will happen. Mitotic errors can create aneuploid cells that have too few or too many of one or more chromosomes, a condition associated with cancer. Early human embryos, cancer cells, infected or intoxicated cells can also suffer from pathological division into three or more daughter cells (tripolar or multipolar mitosis), resulting in severe errors in their chromosomal complements.

In nondisjunction, sister chromatids fail to separate during anaphase. One daughter cell receives both sister chromatids from the nondisjoining chromosome and the other cell receives none. As a result, the former cell gets three copies of the chromosome, a condition known as trisomy, and the latter will have only one copy, a condition known as monosomy. On occasion, when cells experience nondisjunction, they fail to complete cytokinesis and retain both nuclei in one cell, resulting in binucleated cells.

Anaphase lag occurs when the movement of one chromatid is impeded during anaphase. This may be caused by a failure of the mitotic spindle to properly attach to the chromosome. The lagging chromatid is excluded from both nuclei and is lost. Therefore, one of the daughter cells will be monosomic for that chromosome.

Endoreduplication (or endoreplication) occurs when chromosomes duplicate but the cell does not subsequently divide. This results in polyploid cells or, if the chromosomes duplicates repeatedly, polytene chromosomes. Endoreduplication is found in many species and appears to be a normal part of development. Endomitosis is a variant of endoreduplication in which cells replicate their chromosomes during S phase and enter, but prematurely terminate, mitosis. Instead of being divided into two new daughter nuclei, the replicated chromosomes are retained within the original nucleus. The cells then re-enter G_{1} and S phase and replicate their chromosomes again. This may occur multiple times, increasing the chromosome number with each round of replication and endomitosis. Platelet-producing megakaryocytes go through endomitosis during cell differentiation.

Amitosis in ciliates and in animal placental tissues results in a random distribution of parental alleles.

Karyokinesis without cytokinesis originates multinucleated cells called coenocytes.

== Diagnostic marker ==
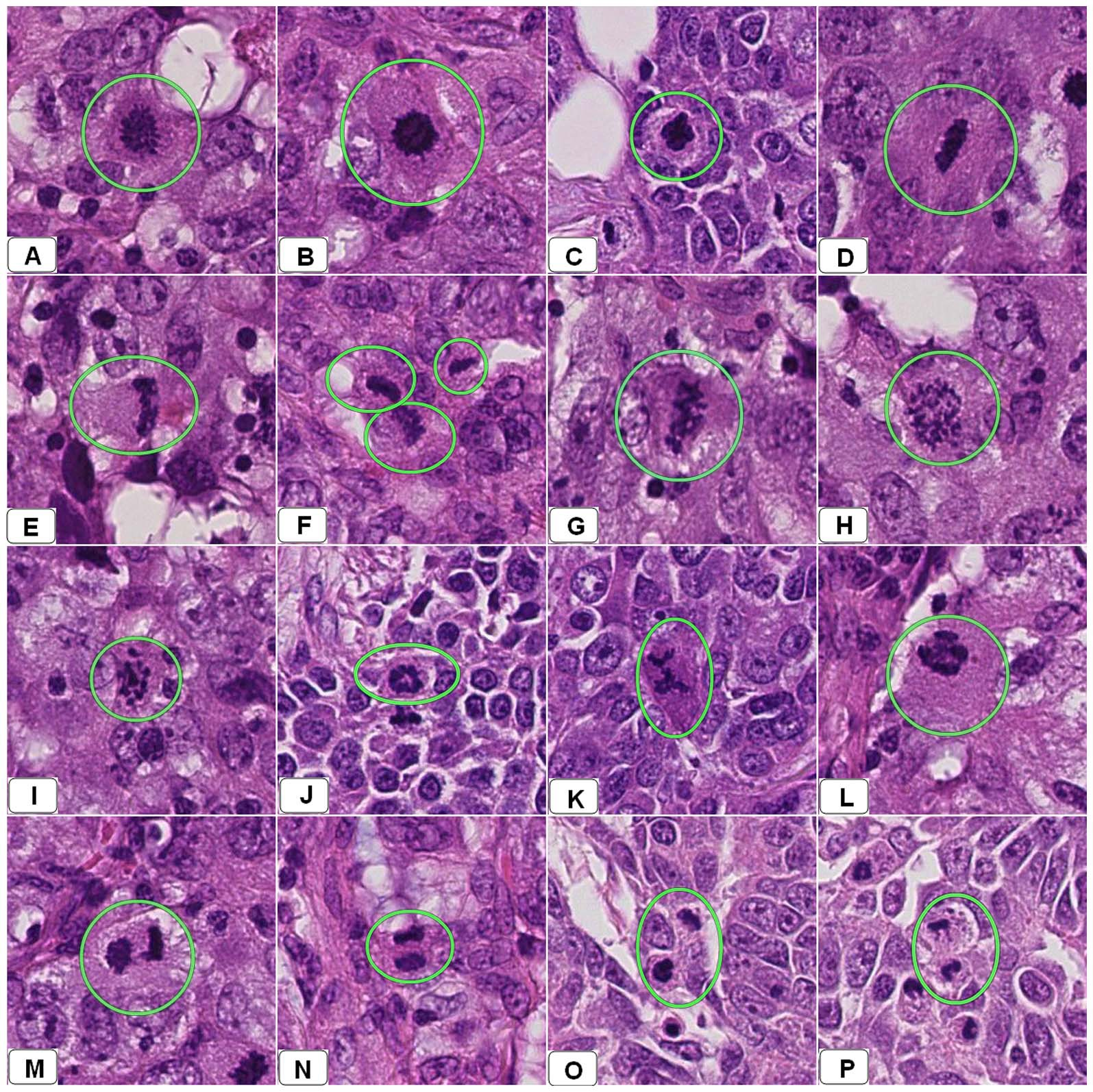
Mitosis appearances in breast cancer

In histopathology, the mitosis rate (mitotic count or mitotic index) is an important parameter in various types of tissue samples, for diagnosis as well as to further specify the aggressiveness of tumors. For example, there is routinely a quantification of mitotic count in breast cancer classification. The mitoses must be counted in an area of the highest mitotic activity. Visually identifying these areas, is difficult in tumors with very high mitotic activity. Also, the detection of atypical forms of mitosis can be used both as a diagnostic and prognostic marker. For example, lag-type mitosis (non-attached condensed chromatin in the area of the mitotic figure) indicates high risk human papillomavirus infection-related cervical cancer. In order to improve the reproducibility and accuracy of the mitotic count, automated image analysis using deep learning-based algorithms have been proposed. However, further research is needed before those algorithms can be used to routine diagnostics.

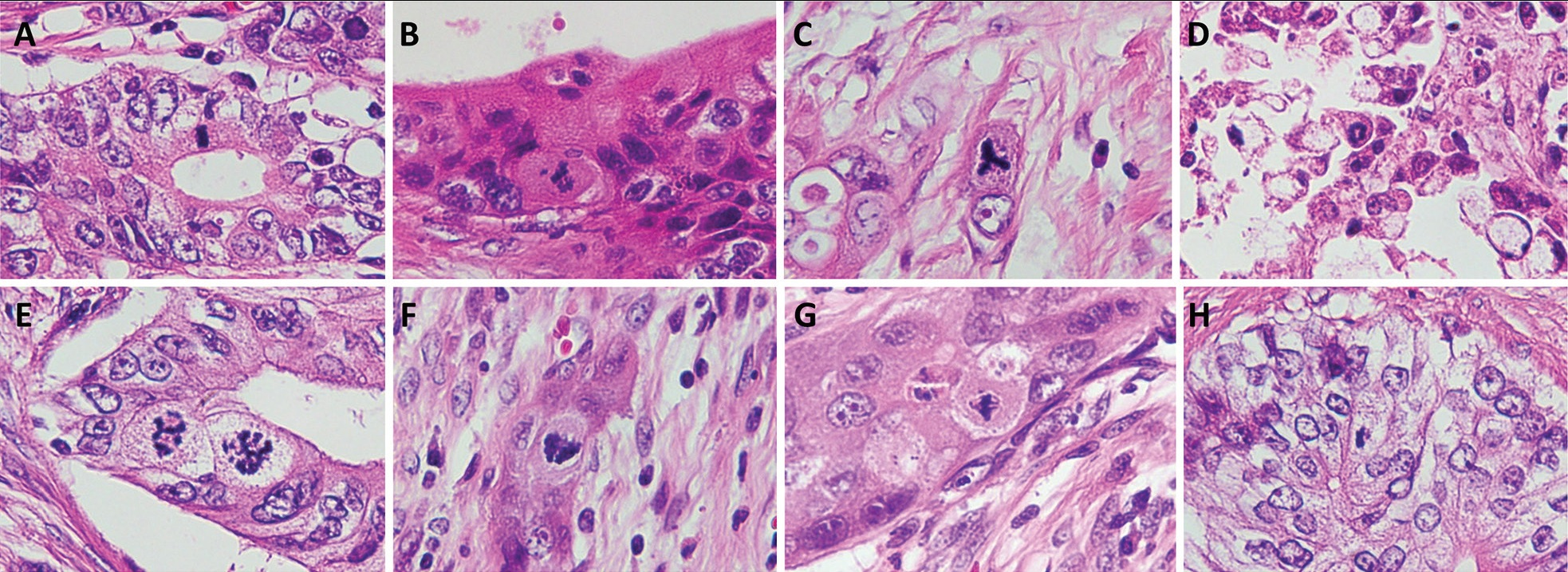
Normal and atypical forms of mitosis in cancer cells. A, normal mitosis; B, chromatin bridge; C, multipolar mitosis; D, ring mitosis; E, dispersed mitosis; F, asymmetrical mitosis; G, lag-type mitosis; and H, micronuclei. H&E stain.

== Related cell processes ==
=== Cell rounding ===
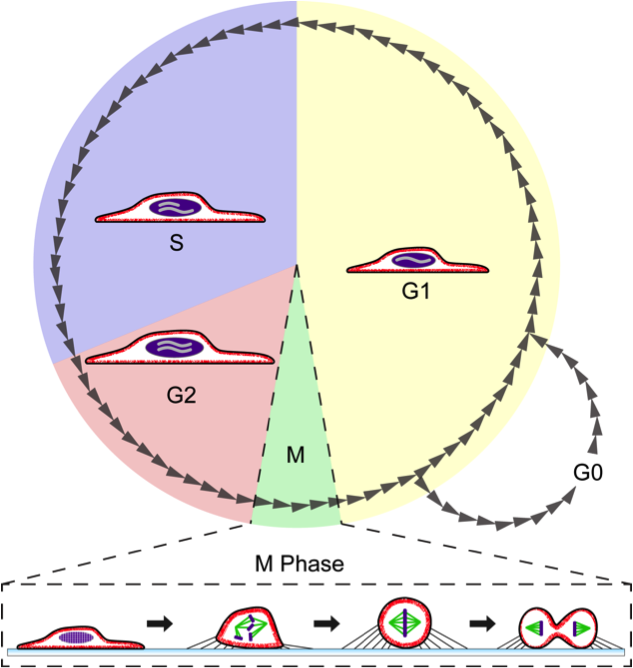
Cell shape changes through mitosis for a typical animal cell cultured on a flat surface. The cell undergoes mitotic cell rounding during spindle assembly and then divides via cytokinesis. The actomyosin cortex is depicted in red, DNA/chromosomes purple, microtubules green, and membrane and retraction fibers in black. Rounding also occurs in live tissue, as described in the text.

In animal tissue, most cells round up to a near-spherical shape during mitosis. In epithelia and epidermis, an efficient rounding process is correlated with proper mitotic spindle alignment and subsequent correct positioning of daughter cells. Moreover, researchers have found that if rounding is heavily suppressed it may result in spindle defects, primarily pole splitting and failure to efficiently capture chromosomes. Therefore, mitotic cell rounding is thought to play a protective role in ensuring accurate mitosis.

Rounding forces are driven by reorganization of F-actin and myosin (actomyosin) into a contractile homogeneous cell cortex that 1) rigidifies the cell periphery and 2) facilitates generation of intracellular hydrostatic pressure (up to 10 fold higher than interphase). The generation of intracellular pressure is particularly critical under confinement, such as would be important in a tissue scenario, where outward forces must be produced to round up against surrounding cells and/or the extracellular matrix. Generation of pressure is dependent on formin-mediated F-actin nucleation and Rho kinase (ROCK)-mediated myosin II contraction, both of which are governed upstream by signaling pathways RhoA and ECT2 through the activity of Cdk1. Due to its importance in mitosis, the molecular components and dynamics of the mitotic actomyosin cortex is an area of active research.

=== Mitotic recombination ===
Mitotic cells irradiated with X-rays in the G1 phase of the cell cycle repair recombinogenic DNA damages primarily by recombination between homologous chromosomes. Mitotic cells irradiated in the G2 phase repair such damages preferentially by sister-chromatid recombination. Mutations in genes encoding enzymes employed in recombination cause cells to have increased sensitivity to being killed by a variety of DNA damaging agents. These findings suggest that mitotic recombination is an adaptation for repairing DNA damages including those that are potentially lethal.

== Evolution ==
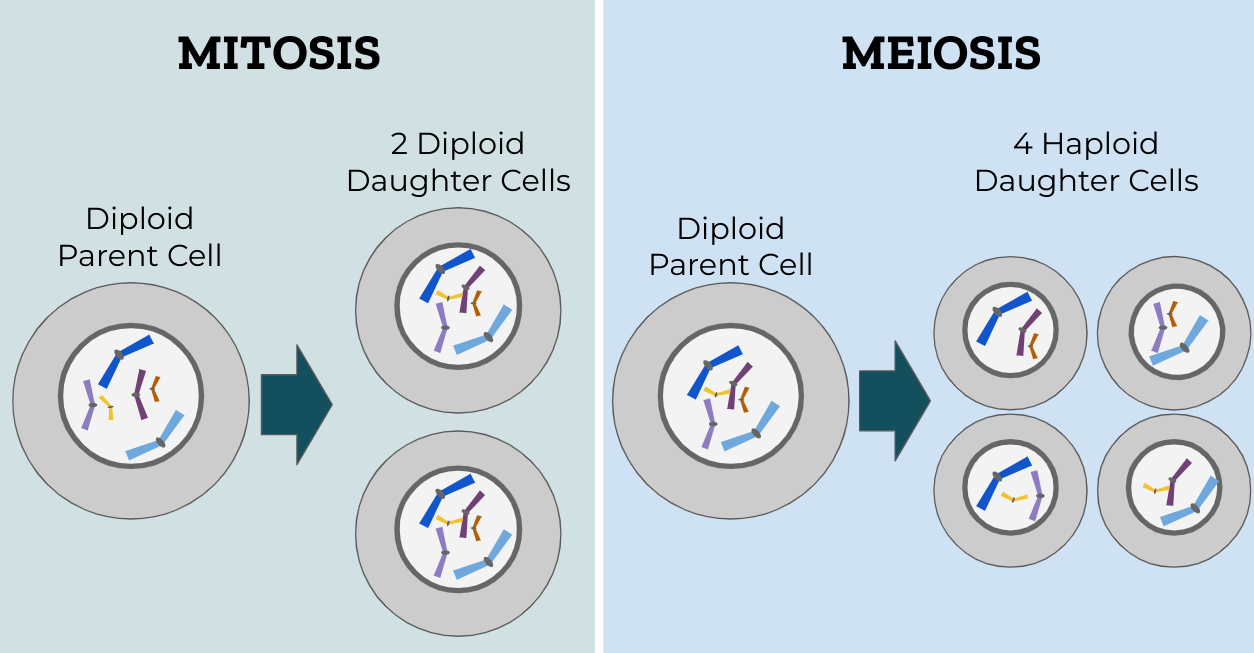
Mitosis and meiosis differences

Some types of cell division in prokaryotes and eukaryotes

There are prokaryotic homologs of all the key molecules of eukaryotic mitosis (e.g., actins, tubulins). Being a universal eukaryotic property, mitosis probably arose at the base of the eukaryotic tree. As mitosis is less complex than meiosis, meiosis may have arisen after mitosis. However, sexual reproduction involving meiosis is also a primitive characteristic of eukaryotes. Thus meiosis and mitosis may both have evolved, in parallel, from ancestral prokaryotic processes.

While in bacterial cell division, after duplication of DNA, two circular chromosomes are attached to a special region of the cell membrane, eukaryotic mitosis is usually characterized by the presence of many linear chromosomes, whose kinetochores attaches to the microtubules of the spindle. In relation to the forms of mitosis, closed intranuclear pleuromitosis seems to be the most primitive type, as it is more similar to bacterial division.

== Gallery ==
Mitotic cells can be visualized microscopically by staining them with fluorescent antibodies and dyes.

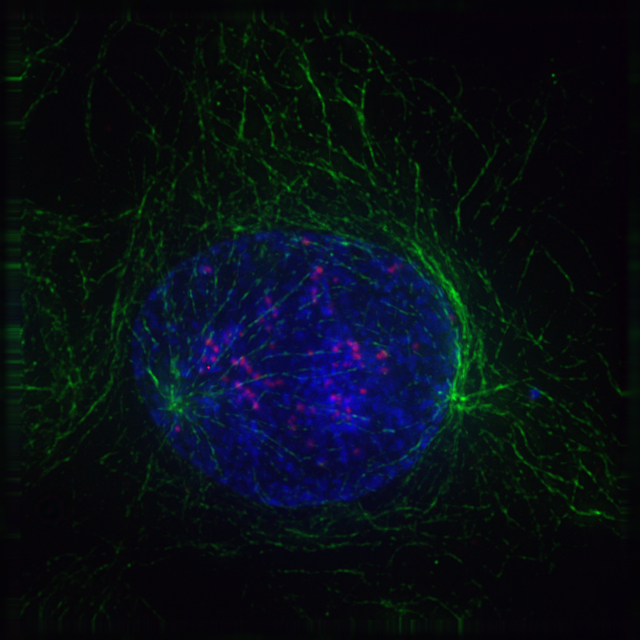
Early prophase: Polar microtubules, shown as green strands, have established a matrix around the currently intact nucleus, with the condensing chromosomes in blue. The red nodules are the centromeres.

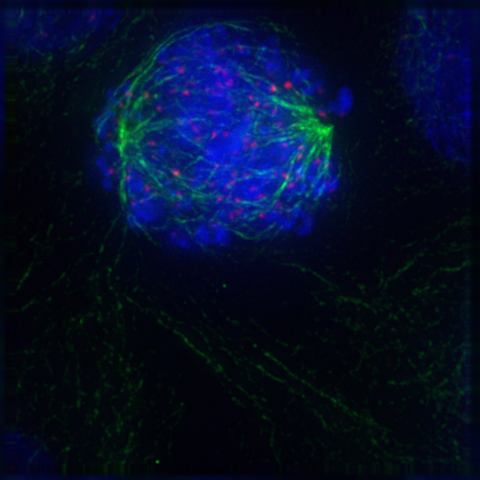
Early prometaphase: The nuclear membrane has just disassembled, allowing the microtubules to quickly interact with the kinetochores, which assemble on the centromeres of the condensing chromosomes.

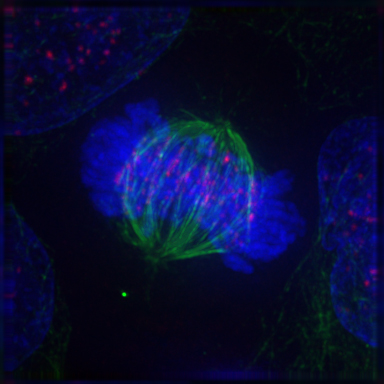
Metaphase: The centrosomes have moved to the poles of the cell and have established the mitotic spindle. The chromosomes have congressed at the metaphase plate.

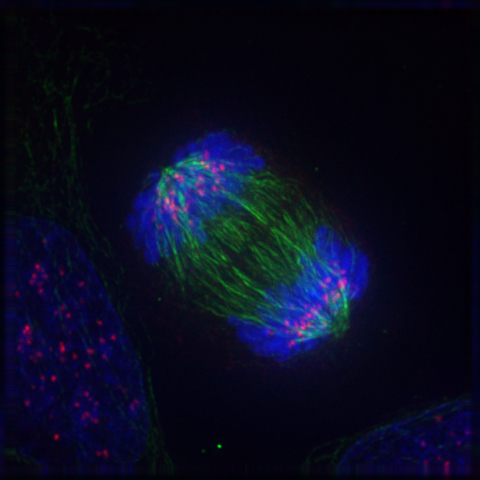
Anaphase: Kinetochore microtubules pull the two sets of chromosomes apart, and lengthening polar microtubules push the halves of the dividing cell further apart, while chromosomes are condensed maximally.

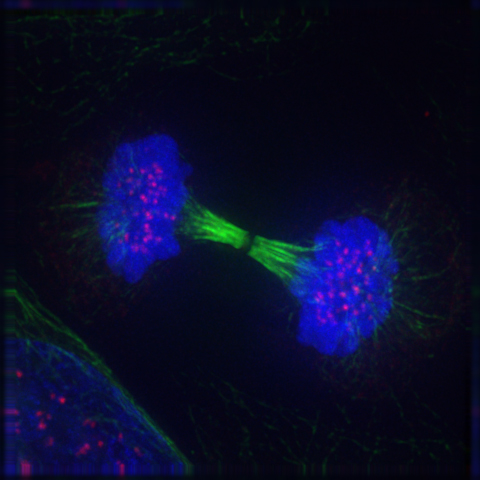
Telophase: Reversal of prophase and prometaphase events and thus completing the cell cycle.

== See also ==
- Chromosome abnormality
- Cytoskeleton
- DREAM complex
- Mitogen
- Mitosis Promoting Factor
- Mitotic bookmarking
