= SYCP1 =

Protein-coding gene in humans

Identifiers
- Aliases: SYCP1, CT8, HOM-TES-14, SCP-1, SCP1, synaptonemal complex protein 1
- External IDs: OMIM: 602162; MGI: 105931; GeneCards: SYCP1
Available structures
PDB	Ortholog search: PDBe RCSB
PDB	List of PDB id codes 4YTO

Gene location (Human)
Chr.	Chromosome 1 (human)
Band	1p13.2	Start	114,854,863 bp
Band	1p13.2	End	114,995,370 bp

Gene location (Mouse)
Chr.	Chromosome 3 (mouse)
Band	3|3 F2.2	Start	102,725,815 bp
Band	3|3 F2.2	End	102,843,416 bp
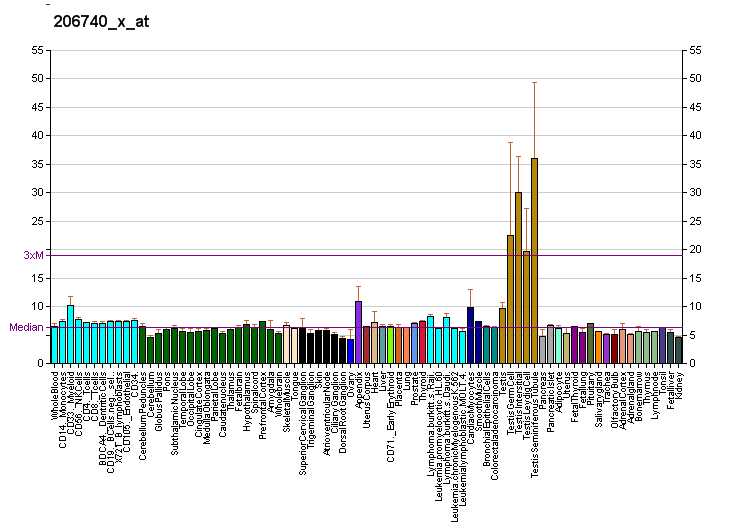

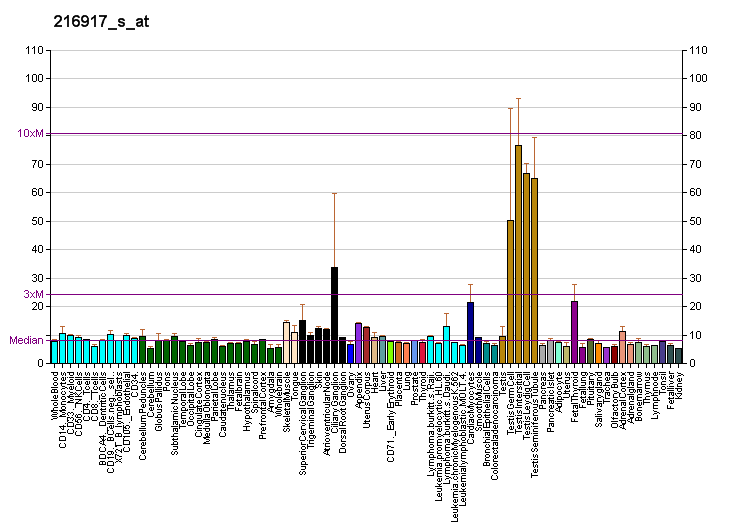
RNA expression pattern
Bgee	Human / Mouse (ortholog); Top expressed in: sperm; right testis; left testis; buccal mucosa cell; testicle; gonad; granulocyte; tibialis anterior muscle; ventricular zone; mononuclear cell / Top expressed in: spermatocyte; spermatid; seminiferous tubule; morula; zygote; secondary oocyte; fallopian tube; embryo; primary oocyte; embryo; More reference expression data
BioGPS	More reference expression data
Gene ontology
Molecular function	DNA binding; double-stranded DNA binding
Cellular component	condensed nuclear chromosome; central element; male germ cell nucleus; chromosome; transverse filament; nucleus; synaptonemal complex; chromosome, centromeric region
Biological process	lateral element assembly; spermatogenesis; meiosis; sperm DNA condensation; regulation of protein localization; meiotic DNA repair synthesis; chiasma assembly; cell division; cell cycle; synaptonemal complex assembly; homologous chromosome pairing at meiosis; reciprocal meiotic recombination; protein homotetramerization
Sources:Amigo / QuickGO
Orthologs
Databases	NCBI: entry; OMA: entry
Species	Human	Mouse
Entrez	6847	20957
Ensembl	ENSG00000198765	ENSMUSG00000027855
UniProt	Q15431	Q62209
RefSeq (mRNA)	NM_001282541; NM_001282542; NM_003176	NM_011516
RefSeq (protein)	NP_001269470; NP_001269471; NP_003167; NP_001269470.1; NP_003167.2	NP_035646
Location (UCSC)	Chr 1: 114.85 – 115 Mb	Chr 3: 102.73 – 102.84 Mb
PubMed search
- Wikidata
View/Edit Human	View/Edit Mouse

Synaptonemal complex protein 1 is a protein involved in the synaptonemal complex during meiosis, that in humans is encoded by the SYCP1 gene.
