= Cell biophysics =

Cell biophysics (or cellular biophysics) is a sub-field of biophysics that focuses on physical principles underlying cell function. Sub-areas of current interest include statistical models of intracellular signaling dynamics, intracellular transport, cell mechanics (including membrane and cytoskeletal mechanics), molecular motors, biological electricity and genetic network theory. The field has benefited greatly from recent advances in live-cell molecular imaging techniques that allow spatial and temporal measurement of macromolecules and macromolecular function. Specialized imaging methods like FRET, FRAP, photoactivation and single molecule imaging have proven useful for mapping macromolecular transport, dynamic conformational changes in proteins and macromolecular interactions. Super-resolution microscopy allows imaging of cell structures below the optical resolution of light. Combining novel experimental tools with mathematical models grounded in the physical sciences has enabled significant recent breakthroughs in the field. Multiple centers across the world are advancing the research area
