= Mitotic cell rounding =

Shape change in animal cells

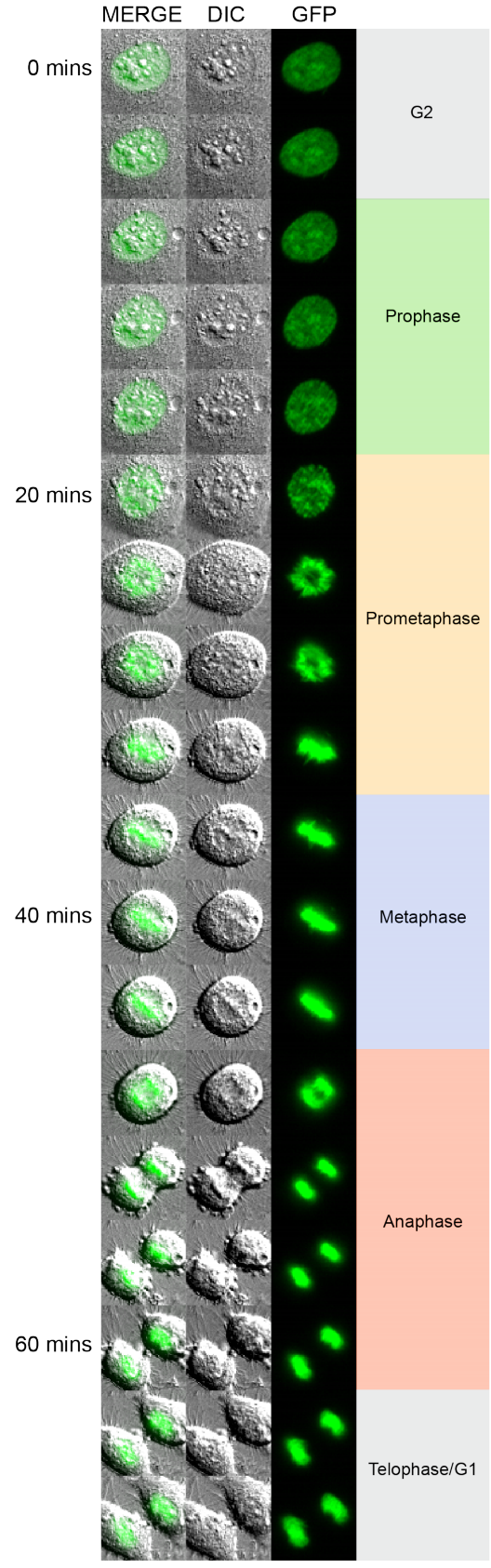
Cell shape changes as a function of mitotic phase. Shown is an example of a HeLa cell cultured on a glass surface. For visualization of DNA and mitotic phase assignment, the cell expresses Histone H2B-GFP to provide fluorescent labeling of chromosomes. Transmitted light (DIC), fluorescence (GFP), and merged images are shown every 4 minutes as the cell transitions from G2 phase through mitosis to telophase/G1 phase.

Mitotic cell rounding is a shape change that occurs in most animal cells that undergo mitosis. Cells abandon the spread or elongated shape characteristic of interphase and contract into a spherical morphology during mitosis. The phenomenon is seen both in artificial cultures in vitro and naturally forming tissue in vivo.

== Early observations ==
In 1935, one of the first published accounts of mitotic rounding in live tissue described cell rounding in the pseudostratified epithelium of the mammalian neural tube. Sauer noticed that cells in mitosis rounded up to the apical, or luminal, surface of the columnar epithelium before dividing and returning to their elongated morphology.

== Significance ==
For a long time it was not clear why cells became round in mitosis. Recent studies in the epithelia and epidermis of various organisms, however, show that mitotic cell rounding might serve several important functions.

- Firstly, in tissue layers such as epithelia, mitotic cell rounding in combination with maintenance of apical cell-cell junctions appears to be necessary for correct mitotic spindle alignment, so that daughter cells divide parallel to the tissue plane, thus sharing apical surface to maintain tissue homeostasis. Failure to achieve this may result in mislocalization of one daughter cell to the basal region of the tissue layer and clearance via apoptotic cell death.
- Secondly, mitotic rounding has been proposed to be a driver for morphological events during tissue development. Examples include epithelial invagination of the Drosophila melanogaster tracheal placode and the anisotropic shape and growth of the inner ear lumen in Zebrafish.
- Thirdly, mitotic rounding has been shown to be important to generate sufficient space and appropriate geometry for proper mitotic spindle function, which is necessary for timely and accurate progression through mitosis.

Thus, mitotic cell rounding is involved in tissue organization and homeostasis, as well as preserving the genomic integrity of proliferating cells.

Robust mitotic cell rounding is not a universal feature of all animal cells. Some more highly specialised asymmetrically-shaped cells appear to undergo only weak rounding during mitosis ("isomorphic" mode of cell division) to facilitate distinct asymmetric identities in daughter cells.

== Mechanisms ==
To understand the physical mechanisms of how cells round up in mitosis, researchers have conducted mechanical measurements with cultured cells in vitro. The forces that drive cell rounding have been characterized by researchers who used flat atomic force microscopy cantilevers to constrain mitotic cells and measure the response force. More than 90% of the forces are generated by the collective activity of myosin II molecular motors in the actin cortex. As a result, the surface tension and effective stiffness of the actin cortex increase as has been consistently observed in mitotic cells. This in turn yields an increase in intracellular hydrostatic pressure due to the Law of Laplace, which relates surface tension of a fluid interface to the differential pressure sustained across that interface. The increase in hydrostatic pressure is important because it produces the outward force necessary to push and rounds up against external objects or impediments, such as flexible cantilever, soft gel or micropillar (in vitro examples), or surrounding extracellular matrix and neighboring cells (in vivo examples). In HeLa cells in vitro, the force generated by a half-deformed mitotic cell is on the order of 50 to 100 nanonewtons. Internal hydrostatic pressure has been measured to increase from below 100 pascals in interphase to 3 to 10 fold that in mitosis.

In similar in vitro experiments, it was found that the threshold forces required to prevent mitosis are in excess of 100 nN. At threshold forces the cell suffers a loss of cortical F-actin uniformity, which further amplifies the susceptibility to applied force. These effects potentiate distortion of cell dimensions and subsequent perturbation of mitotic progression via spindle defects.

Release of stable focal adhesions is another important aspect of mitotic rounding. Cells that are genetically perturbed to manifest constitutively active adhesion regulators are unable to properly remodel their focal adhesions and facilitate the generation of a uniform actomyosin cortex. Mitotic cells have been shown to down-regulate cell-ECM adhesion while, in a cell-type dependent manner, retaining or strengthening cell-cell adhesions. Overall, the biochemical events governing the morphological and mechanical changes in mitotic cells are orchestrated by the mitotic master regulator Cdk1.

Apart from F-actin and myosin-II, cytoskeletal proteins reported to be involved in mitotic cell rounding include:

- ERM proteins (Ezrin, Radaxin, Moesin)
- WDR1
- Tropomyosin 3.1/2 (Tpm3.1/2)
- Vimentin
- Formins (such as Diaph1)
- Actin capping proteins (such as CAPZB)
- Cofilins (such as CFL1)
- Alpha-actinins (such as ACTN1 and ACTN4)

Several disease-related genes have also been implicated in mitotic cell rounding. These include Parkinson’s disease associated DJ-1/Park7 and FAM134A/RETREG2
