= Prophase =

First phase of mitosis and meiosis

Prophase is the first step of cell division in mitosis. As it occurs after G2 of interphase, DNA has been already replicated when prophase begins.

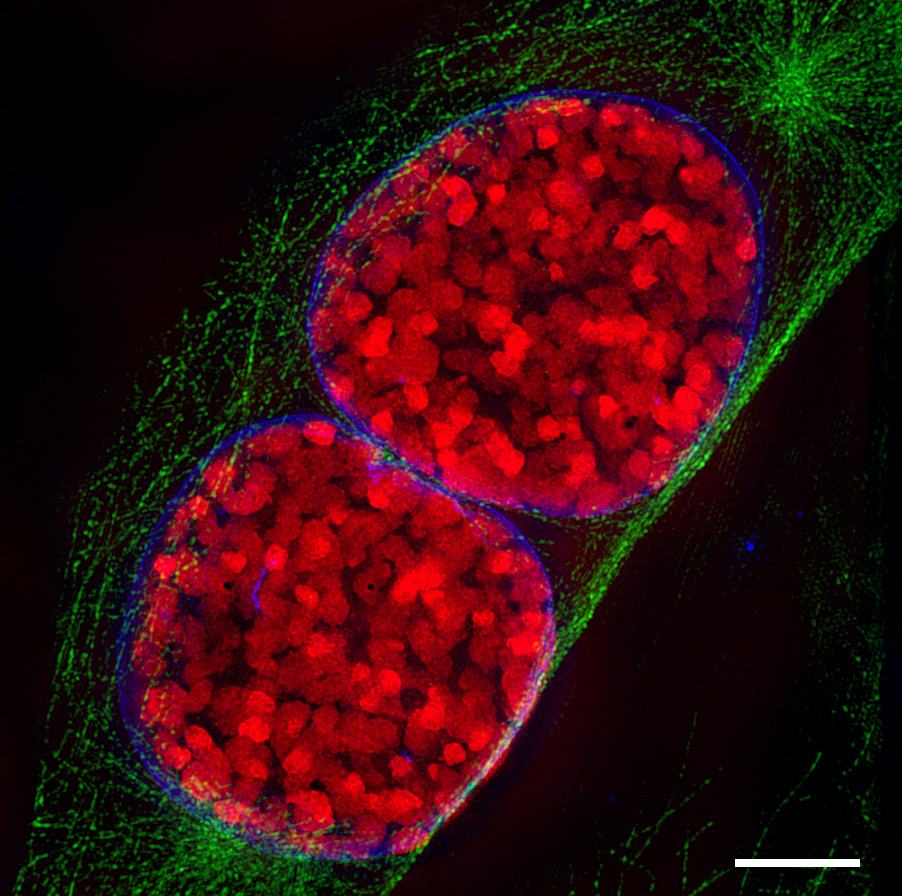
Fluorescence microscope image of two mouse cell nuclei in prophase (scale bar is 5 μm).

Prophase (from Ancient Greek προ- (pro-) 'before' and φάσις (phásis) 'appearance') is the first stage of cell division in both mitosis and meiosis. Beginning after interphase, DNA has already been replicated when the cell enters prophase. The main occurrences in prophase are the condensation of the chromatin reticulum and the disappearance of the nucleolus.

== Staining and microscopy ==
Microscopy can be used to visualize condensed chromosomes as they move through meiosis and mitosis.

Various DNA stains are used to treat cells such that condensing chromosomes can be visualized as they move through prophase.

The giemsa G-banding technique is commonly used to identify mammalian chromosomes, but utilizing the technology on plant cells was originally difficult due to the high degree of chromosome compaction in plant cells. G-banding was fully realized for plant chromosomes in 1990. During both meiotic and mitotic prophase, giemsa staining can be applied to cells to elicit G-banding in chromosomes. Silver staining, a more modern technology, in conjunction with giemsa staining can be used to image the synaptonemal complex throughout the various stages of meiotic prophase. To perform G-banding, chromosomes must be fixed, and thus it is not possible to perform on living cells.

Fluorescent stains such as DAPI can be used in both live plant and animal cells. These stains do not band chromosomes, but instead allow for DNA probing of specific regions and genes. Use of fluorescent microscopy has vastly improved spatial resolution.

== Mitotic prophase ==
Prophase is the first stage of mitosis in animal cells, and the second stage of mitosis in plant cells. At the start of prophase there are two identical copies of each chromosome in the cell due to replication in interphase. These copies are referred to as sister chromatids and are attached by DNA element called the centromere. The main events of prophase are: the condensation of chromosomes, the movement of the centrosomes, the formation of the mitotic spindle, and the beginning of nucleoli break down.

=== Condensation of chromosomes ===
DNA that was replicated in interphase is condensed from DNA strands with lengths reaching 0.7 μm down to 0.2-0.3 μm. This process employs the condensin complex. Condensed chromosomes consist of two sister chromatids joined at the centromere.

=== Movement of centrosomes ===
During prophase in animal cells, centrosomes move far enough apart to be resolved using a light microscope. Microtubule activity in each centrosome is increased due to recruitment of γ-tubulin. Replicated centrosomes from interphase move apart towards opposite poles of the cell, powered by centrosome associated motor proteins. Interdigitated interpolar microtubules from each centrosome interact with each other, helping to move the centrosomes to opposite poles.

=== Formation of the mitotic spindle ===
Microtubules involved in the interphase scaffolding break down as the replicated centrosomes separate. The movement of centrosomes to opposite poles is accompanied in animal cells by the organization of individual radial microtubule arrays (asters) by each centriole. Interpolar microtubules from both centrosomes interact, joining the sets of microtubules and forming the basic structure of the mitotic spindle. Plant cells do not have centrosomes and the chromosomes can nucleate microtubule assembly into the mitotic apparatus. In plant cells, microtubules gather at opposite poles and begin to form the spindle apparatus at locations called foci. The mitotic spindle is of great importance in the process of mitosis and will eventually segregate the sister chromatids in metaphase.

=== Beginning of nucleoli breakdown ===
The nucleoli begin to break down in prophase, resulting in the discontinuation of ribosome production. This indicates a redirection of cellular energy from general cellular metabolism to cellular division. The nuclear envelope stays intact during this process.

== Meiotic prophase ==
Meiosis involves two rounds of chromosome segregation and thus undergoes prophase twice, resulting in prophase I and prophase II. Prophase I is the most complex phase in all of meiosis because homologous chromosomes must pair and exchange genetic information. Prophase II is very similar to mitotic prophase.

=== Prophase I ===
Prophase I is divided into five phases: leptotene, zygotene, pachytene, diplotene, and diakinesis. In addition to the events that occur in mitotic prophase, several crucial events occur within these phases such as pairing of homologous chromosomes and the reciprocal exchange of genetic material between these homologous chromosomes. In meiosis, prophase I is the longest and complex stage. It occurs at different speeds dependent on species and sex. Many species arrest meiosis in diplotene of prophase I until ovulation. In humans, decades can pass as oocytes remain arrested in prophase I only to quickly complete meiosis I prior to ovulation.

==== Leptotene ====
In the first stage of prophase I, leptotene (from the Greek for "delicate"), chromosomes begin to condense. Each chromosome is in a diploid state and consists of two sister chromatids; however, the chromatin of the sister chromatids is not yet condensed enough to be resolvable in microscopy. Homologous regions within homologous chromosome pairs begin to associate with each other.

==== Zygotene ====
In the second phase of prophase I, zygotene (from the Greek for "conjugation"), all maternally and paternally derived chromosomes have found their homologous partner. The homologous pairs then undergo synapsis, a process by which the synaptonemal complex (a proteinaceous structure) aligns corresponding regions of genetic information on maternally and paternally derived non-sister chromatids of homologous chromosome pairs. The paired homologous chromosome bound by the synaptonemal complex are referred to as bivalents or tetrads. Sex (X and Y) chromosomes do not fully synapse because only a small region of the chromosomes are homologous.

The nucleolus moves from a central to a peripheral position in the nucleus.

==== Pachytene ====
The third phase of prophase I, pachytene (from the Greek for "thick"), begins at the completion of synapsis. Chromatin has condensed enough that chromosomes can now be resolved in microscopy. Structures called recombination nodules form on the synaptonemal complex of bivalents. These recombination nodules facilitate genetic exchange between the non-sister chromatids of the synaptonemal complex in an event known as crossing-over or genetic recombination. Multiple recombination events can occur on each bivalent. In humans, an average of 2-3 events occur on each chromosome.

==== Diplotene ====
In the fourth phase of prophase I, diplotene (from the Greek for "twofold"), crossing-over is completed. Homologous chromosomes retain a full set of genetic information; however, the homologous chromosomes are now of mixed maternal and paternal descent. Visible junctions called chiasmata hold the homologous chromosomes together at locations where recombination occurred as the synaptonemal complex dissolves. It is at this stage where meiotic arrest occurs in many species.

==== Diakinesis ====
In the fifth and final phase of prophase I, diakinesis (from the Greek for "double movement"), full chromatin condensation has occurred and all four sister chromatids can be seen in bivalents with microscopy. The rest of the phase resemble the early stages of mitotic prometaphase, as the meiotic prophase ends with the spindle apparatus beginning to form, and the nuclear membrane beginning to break down.

=== Prophase II ===
Prophase II of meiosis is very similar to prophase of mitosis. The most noticeable difference is that prophase II occurs with a haploid number of chromosomes as opposed to the diploid number in mitotic prophase. In both animal and plant cells chromosomes may de-condense during telophase I requiring them to re-condense in prophase II. If chromosomes do not need to re-condense, prophase II often proceeds very quickly as is seen in the model organism Arabidopsis.

== Prophase I arrest ==
Female mammals and birds are born possessing all the oocytes needed for future ovulations, and these oocytes are arrested at the prophase I stage of meiosis. In humans, as an example, oocytes are formed between three and four months of gestation within the fetus and are therefore present at birth. During this prophase I arrested stage (dictyate), which may last for decades, four copies of the genome are present in the oocytes. The adaptive significance of prophase I arrest is still not fully understood. However, it has been proposed that the arrest of oocytes at the four genome copy stage may provide the informational redundancy needed to repair damage in the DNA of the germline. The repair process used appears to be homologous recombinational repair. Prophase arrested oocytes have a high capability for efficient repair of DNA damages. DNA repair capability appears to be a key quality control mechanism in the female germ line and a critical determinant of fertility.

== Differences in plant and animal cell prophase ==
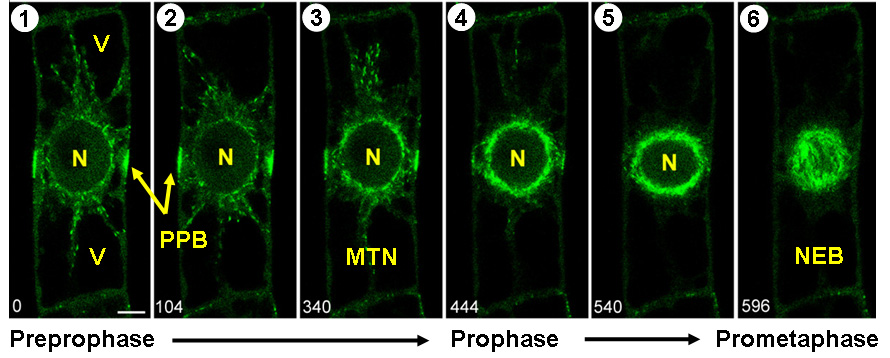
Arabidopsis thaliana cell in preprophase, prophase and prometaphase. Preprophase band is present along the cell wall from images 1–3, is fading in image 4, and disappears by image 5.

The most notable difference between prophase in plant cells and animal cells occurs because plant cells lack centrioles. The organization of the spindle apparatus is associated instead with foci at opposite poles of the cell or is mediated by chromosomes. Another notable difference is preprophase, an additional step in plant mitosis that results in formation of the preprophase band, a structure composed of microtubules. In mitotic prophase I of plants, this band disappears.

== Cell checkpoints ==
Prophase I in meiosis is the most complex iteration of prophase that occurs in both plant cells and animal cells. To ensure pairing of homologous chromosomes and recombination of genetic material occurs properly, there are cellular checkpoints in place. The meiotic checkpoint network is a DNA damage response system that controls double strand break repair, chromatin structure, and the movement and pairing of chromosomes. The system consists of multiple pathways (including the meiotic recombination checkpoint) that prevent the cell from entering metaphase I with errors due to recombination.

== See also ==
- Prometaphase
- Metaphase
- Anaphase
- Telophase
- Meiosis
- Mitosis
- Cytoskeleton
- Homologous chromosome
