= Phragmosome =

Transient structure in dividing plant cells

Phragmosome formation in a highly vacuolated plant cell. From top to bottom: 1) Interphase cell with large central vacuole. 2) Cytoplasmic strands starting to penetrate vacuole. 3) Nucleus migration into center and formation of the phragmosome. 4) Phragmosome formation completed and formation of preprophase band marking future cell division plane.

The phragmosome is a sheet of cytoplasm forming in highly vacuolated plant cells in preparation for mitosis. In contrast to animal cells, plant cells often contain large central vacuoles occupying up to 90% of the total cell volume and pushing the nucleus against the cell wall. In order for mitosis to occur, the nucleus has to move into the center of the cell. This happens during G2 phase of the cell cycle.

Initially, cytoplasmic strands form that penetrate the central vacuole and provide pathways for nuclear migration. Actin filaments along these cytoplasmic strands pull the nucleus into the center of the cell. These cytoplasmic strands fuse into a transverse sheet of cytoplasm along the plane of future cell division, forming the phragmosome. Phragmosome formation is only clearly visible in dividing plant cells that are highly vacuolated.

Just before mitosis, a dense band of microtubules appears around the phragmosome and the future division plane just below the plasma membrane. This preprophase band marks the equatorial plane of the future mitotic spindle as well as the future fusion sites for the new cell plate with the existing cell wall. It disappears as soon as the nuclear envelope breaks down and the mitotic spindle forms.

When mitosis is completed, the cell plate and new cell wall form starting from the center along the plane occupied by the phragmosome. The cell plate grows outwards until it fuses with the cell wall of the dividing cell at exactly the spots predicted by the preprophase band.
