= Phragmoplast =

Structure in dividing plant cells that builds the daughter cell wall

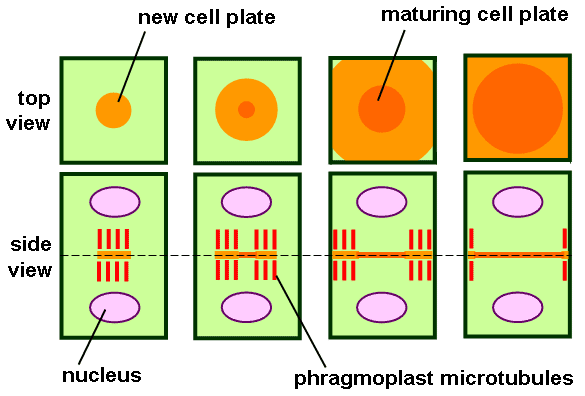
Phragmoplast and cell plate formation in a plant cell during cytokinesis. Left side: Phragmoplast forms and cell plate starts to assemble in the center of the cell. Towards the right: Phragmoplast enlarges in a donut-shape towards the outside of the cell, leaving behind mature cell plate in the center. The cell plate will transform into the new cell wall once cytokinesis is complete.

The phragmoplast is a plant cell–specific structure that forms during late cytokinesis. It serves as a scaffold for cell plate assembly and subsequent formation of a new cell wall separating the two daughter cells. The phragmoplast can only be observed in Phragmoplastophyta, a clade that includes the Coleochaetophyceae, Zygnematophyceae, Mesotaeniaceae, and Embryophyta (land plants). Some algae use another type of microtubule array, a phycoplast, during cytokinesis.

== Structure ==
The phragmoplast is a complex assembly of microtubules (MTs), microfilaments (MFs), and endoplasmic reticulum (ER) elements, that assemble in two opposing sets perpendicular to the plane of the future cell plate during anaphase and telophase. It is initially barrel-shaped and forms from the mitotic spindle between the two daughter nuclei while nuclear envelopes reassemble around them. The cell plate initially forms as a disc between the two halves of the phragmoplast structure. While new cell plate material is added to the edges of the growing plate, the phragmoplast microtubules disappear in the center and regenerate at the edges of the growing cell plate. The two structures grow outwards until they reach the outer wall of the dividing cell. If a phragmosome was present in the cell, the phragmoplast and cell plate will grow through the space occupied by the phragmosome. They will reach the parent cell wall exactly at the position formerly occupied by the preprophase band.

The microtubules and actin filaments within the phragmoplast serve to guide vesicles with cell wall material to the growing cell plate. Actin filaments are also possibly involved in guiding the phragmoplast to the site of the former preprophase band location at the parent cell wall. While the cell plate is growing, segments of smooth endoplasmic reticulum are trapped within it, later forming the plasmodesmata connecting the two daughter cells.

The phragmoplast can be differentiated topographically into two areas, the midline that includes the central plane where some of the plus-ends of both anti-parallel sets of microtubules (MTs) interdigitate (as in the midbody matrix), and the distal regions at both sides of the midline.

== Role in the plant cell cycle ==
After anaphase, the phragmoplast emerges from the remnant spindle MTs in between the daughter nuclei. MT plus ends overlap the equator of phragmoplast at the site where the cell plate will form. The formation of the cell plate depends on localized secretory vesicle fusion to deliver membrane and cell-wall components. Excess membrane lipid and cell-wall components are recycled by clathrin/dynamin-dependent retrograde membrane traffic. Once the initial cell plate forms at its center, the phragmoplast begins to expand outward to reach the cell edges. Actin filaments also localize to phragmoplast and accumulate greatly at late telophase. Evidence suggests that actin filaments serve phragmoplast expansion more than initial organization, given that disorganization of actin filaments via drug treatments lead to the delay of cell-plate expansion.

Many microtubule-associated proteins (MAPs) have been localized to the phragmoplast, including both constitutively expressed ones (such as MOR1, katanin, CLASP, SPR2, and γ-tubulin complex proteins) and those expressed specifically during M-phase, such as EB1c, TANGLED1 and augmin complex proteins. The functions of these proteins in the phragmoplast are presumably similar to their functions elsewhere in the cell. Most research into phragmoplast MAPs have been focused on the midline because it is, first, where most of the membrane fusion takes place and, second, where the two sets of anti-parallel MTs are held together. The discovery of an important variety of molecules that localize to the phragmoplast midline is shedding light on the complex processes operating in this phragmoplast region.

Two proteins that have critical functions for antiparallel MT bundling at the phragmoplast midline are MAP65-3 and kinesin-5. The kinesin-7 family proteins, HINKEL/AtNACK1 and AtNACK2/TES, recruit a mitogen-activated protein kinase (MAPK) cascade to the midline and induce MAP65 phosphorylation. Phosphorylated MAP65-1 also accumulates at the midline and reduces MT-bundling activities for cell-plate expansion. The essential mechanism of MAPK cascade for phragmoplast expansion is suppressed by cyclin dependent kinase (CDK) activity before telophase.

Certain phragmoplast midline-accumulating MAPs are essential proteins for cytokinesis. The kinesin-12 members, PAKRP1 and PAKRP1L, accumulate at the midline and double loss-of-function mutants have defective cytokinesis during male gametogenesis. PAKRP2 accumulates at midline and also in puncta throughout the phragmoplast, which implies that PAKRP2 participates in Golgi-derived vesicle transport. Moss homologs of PAKRP2, KINID1a, and KINID1b localize to the phragmoplast midline and are essential for phragmoplast organization. RUNKEL, which is a HEAT repeat-containing MAP, also accumulates at the midline and cytokinesis is aberrant in lines with the loss-of-function mutations in this protein. Another midline-localized protein, “two-in-on” (TIO), is a putative kinase and is also required for cytokinesis as shown by defects in a mutant. TIO interacts with PAKRP1, PAKRP1L (kinesin-12), and NACK2/TES (kinesin-7) according to the yeast two hybrid assays. Finally, TPLATE, an adaptin-like protein, accumulates at the cell plate and is essential for cytokinesis.
