= Enucleation (microbiology) =

In the context of microbiology, enucleation refers to removing the nucleus of a cell. By replacing it with a different nucleus, this technique is used mainly in cloning but can also be used for creating hybrids of plants or animals. It was discovered that cells can be chemically enucleated with Cytochalasin B in 1967.

== List of enucleated cells ==
- Red blood cell in most mammals
- Platelets in mammals

== See also ==
- Cytoplasmic hybrid
