= Preprophase band =

Array found in plant cells that are about to undergo cell division

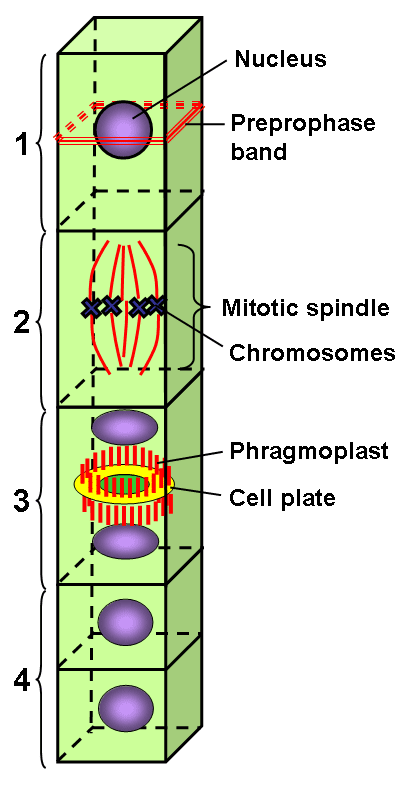
The preprophase band predicts the cell division plane: 1) Preprophase band formation during preprophase. 2) Metaphase spindle orients with the equator along the plane marked by preprophase band. 3) Phragmoplast and cell plate form along the plane marked by preprophase band. 4) The new cell wall of the daughter cells connects with the parent cell wall along the line of the former preprophase band location.

The preprophase band is a microtubule array found in plant cells that are about to undergo cell division and enter the preprophase stage of the plant cell cycle. Besides the phragmosome, it is the first microscopically visible sign that a plant cell is about to enter mitosis. The preprophase band was first observed and described by Jeremy Pickett-Heaps and Donald Northcote at Cambridge University in 1966.

Just before mitosis starts, the preprophase band forms as a dense band of microtubules around the phragmosome and the future division plane just below the plasma membrane. It encircles the nucleus at the equatorial plane of the future mitotic spindle when dividing cells enter the G2 phase of the cell cycle after DNA replication is complete. The preprophase band consists mainly of microtubules and microfilaments (actin) and is generally 2-3 μm wide. When stained with fluorescent markers, it can be seen as two bright spots close to the cell wall on either side of the nucleus.

Plant cells lack centrosomes as microtubule organizing centers. Instead, the microtubules of the mitotic spindle aggregate on the nuclear surface and are reoriented to form the spindle at the end of prophase. The preprophase band also functions in properly orienting the mitotic spindle, and contributes to efficient spindle formation during prometaphase

The preprophase band disappears as soon as the nuclear envelope breaks down and the mitotic spindle forms, leaving behind an actin-depleted zone. However, its position marks the future fusion sites for the new cell plate with the existing cell wall during telophase. When mitosis is completed, the cell plate and new cell wall form starting from the center along the plane occupied by the phragmosome. The cell plate grows outwards until it fuses with the cell wall of the dividing cell at exactly the spots predicted by the position of the preprophase band.

== Bibliography ==
- P.H. Raven, R.F. Evert, S.E. Eichhorn (2005): Biology of Plants, 7th Edition, W.H. Freeman and Company Publishers, New York, NY, ISBN 0-7167-1007-2
- L. Taiz, E. Zeiger (2006): Plant Physiology, 4th Edition, Sinauer Associates, Inc., Publishers, Sunderland, MA, ISBN 0-87893-856-7
