= Synaptonemal complex =

Protein structure

Schematic of the synaptonemal complex at different stages during Prophase I

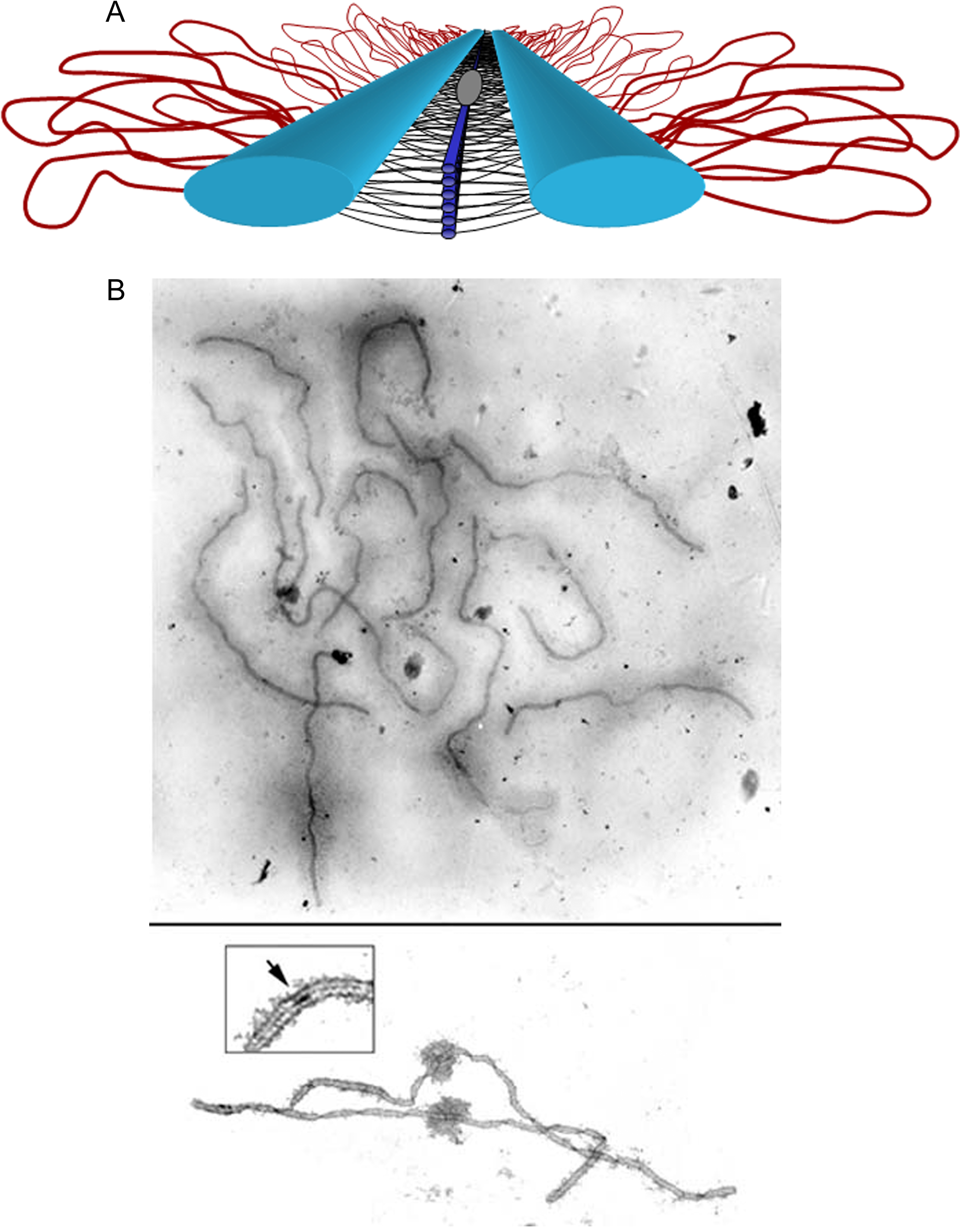
A Homologous chromosomes (light blue) align and synapse together via transverse filaments (black lines) and longitudinal filaments (dark blue). Recombination nodules (gray ellipsoids) on the central region may help in completing recombination. Chromatin (red loops) is attached to its sexual leg and toe, extending from both sister chromatids. B Top: Set of tomato SCs. Chromatin "sheaths" visible around each SC. Bottom: Two tomato SCs with the chromatin removed, allowing kinetochores ("ball-like" structures) at centromeres to be revealed.

The synaptonemal complex (SC) is a protein structure that forms between homologous chromosomes (two pairs of sister chromatids) during meiosis and is thought to mediate synapsis and recombination during prophase I during meiosis in eukaryotes. It is currently thought that the SC functions primarily as a scaffold to allow interacting chromatids to complete their crossover activities.

== Composition ==
The synaptonemal complex is a tripartite structure consisting of two parallel lateral regions and a central element. This "tripartite structure" is seen during the pachytene stage of the first meiotic prophase, both in males and in females during gametogenesis. Previous to the pachytene stage, during leptonema, the lateral elements begin to form and they initiate and complete their pairing during the zygotene stage. After pachynema ends, the SC usually becomes disassembled and can no longer be identified.

In humans, three specific components of the synaptonemal complex have been characterized: SC protein-1 (SYCP1), SC protein-2 (SYCP2), and SC protein-3 (SYCP3). The SYCP1 gene is on chromosome 1p13; the SYCP2 gene is on chromosome 20q13.33; and the gene for SYCP3 is on chromosome 12q.

The synaptonemal complex was described by Montrose James Moses in 1956 in primary spermatocytes of crayfish and by Don Fawcett in spermatocytes of pigeon, cat and man. As seen with the electron microscope, the synaptonemal complex is formed by two "lateral elements", mainly formed by SYCP3 and secondarily by SYCP2, a "central element" that contains at least two additional proteins and the amino terminal region of SYCP1, and a "central region" spanned between the two lateral elements, that contains the "transverse filaments" composed mainly by the protein SYCP1.

The SCs can be seen with the light microscope using silver staining or with immunofluorescence techniques that label the proteins SYCP3 or SYCP2.

== Assembly and disassembly ==
Formation of the SC usually reflects the pairing or "synapsis" of homologous chromosomes and may be used to probe the presence of pairing abnormalities in individuals carrying chromosomal abnormalities, either in number or in the chromosomal structure. The sex chromosomes in male mammals show only "partial synapsis" as they usually form only a short SC in the XY pair. The SC shows very little structural variability among eukaryotic organisms despite some significant protein differences. In many organisms the SC carries one or several "recombination nodules" associated with its central space. These nodules are thought to correspond to mature genetic recombination events or "crossovers". In male mice, gamma irradiation increases meiotic crossovers in SCs. This indicates that exogenously caused DNA damages are likely repaired by crossover recombination in SCs. The finding of an interaction between a SC structural component [synaptonemal central element protein 2 (SYCE2)] and recombinational repair protein RAD51 also suggests a role for the SC in DNA repair.

In cell development the synaptonemal complex disappears during the late prophase of meiosis I. It is formed during zygotene.

== Cancer ==
Although synaptonemal complex protein 2 (SYCP2) is a meiotic protein, it is aberrantly and commonly expressed in breast and ovarian cancers. SYCP2 protein expression in these cancers is associated with broad resistance to drugs that induced DNA damage, i.e. DNA damage response (DDR) drugs. SYCP2 is employed in the repair of DNA double-strand breaks by transcription-coupled homologous recombination. SYCP2 appears to confer cancer cell resistance to therapeutic DNA damaging agents by stimulating R-loop mediated double strand break repair. Thus inhibition of SYCP2 expression is being studied in efforts to improve therapy for breast and ovarian cancers.

== Necessity in eukaryotes ==
It is now evident that the synaptonemal complex is not required for genetic recombination in some organisms. For instance, in protozoan ciliates such as Tetrahymena thermophila and Paramecium tetraurelia genetic crossover does not appear to require synaptonemal complex formation. Research has shown that not only does the SC form after genetic recombination but mutant yeast cells unable to assemble a synaptonemal complex can still engage in the exchange of genetic information. However, in other organisms like the C. elegans nematode, formation of chiasmata require the formation of the synaptonemal complex.
