= Interphase =

G1, S and G2 phases of the cell cycle

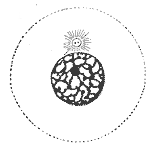
An illustration of interphase. The chromatin has not yet condensed, and the cell is undergoing its normal functions.

An image of the nucleus of a cell (HT1080) currently in interphase (likely G1). The neighboring cell (top-left) is currently in the telophase of mitosis. Note: Cytoplasm of this cell or the neighboring cell is not visible. Image taken using an optical microscope and DAPI staining of DNA.

Interphase is the active portion of the cell cycle that includes the G1, S, and G2 phases, where the cell grows, replicates its DNA, and prepares for mitosis, respectively. Interphase was formerly called the "resting phase," but the cell in interphase is not simply dormant. Calling it so would be misleading since a cell in interphase is very busy synthesizing proteins, transcribing DNA into RNA, engulfing extracellular material, and processing signals, to name just a few activities. The cell is quiescent only in G0. Interphase is the phase of the cell cycle in which a typical cell spends 90% of its life. Interphase is the "daily living" or metabolic phase of the cell, in which the cell obtains nutrients and metabolizes them, grows, replicates its DNA in preparation for mitosis, and conducts other "normal" cell functions.

A common misconception is that interphase is the first stage of mitosis, but since mitosis is the division of the nucleus, prophase is actually the first stage.

In interphase, the cell gets itself ready for mitosis or meiosis. Somatic cells, or normal diploid cells of the body, go through mitosis in order to reproduce themselves through cell division, whereas diploid germ cells (i.e., primary spermatocytes and primary oocytes) go through meiosis in order to create haploid gametes (i.e., sperm and ova) for the purpose of sexual reproduction.

== Stages of interphase ==
There are three stages of cellular interphase, with each phase ending when a cellular checkpoint checks the accuracy of the stage's completion before proceeding to the next. The stages of interphase are:

- G_{1} (Gap 1), in this phase the cell grows and functions normally. During this time, a high amount of protein synthesis occurs and the cell grows (to about double its original size) – more organelles are produced and the volume of the cytoplasm increases. If the cell is not to divide again, it will enter G_{0}.
- Synthesis (S), in this phase the cell synthesizes its DNA and the amount of DNA is doubled but the number of chromosomes remains constant (via semiconservative replication).
- G_{2} (Gap 2), in this phase the cell resumes its growth in preparation for division. The cell continues to grow until mitosis begins. In plants, chloroplasts divide during G2.
- In addition, some cells that do not divide often or ever, enter a stage called G_{0} (Gap zero), which is either a stage separate from interphase or an extended G_{1}.

The duration of time spent in interphase and in each stage of interphase is variable and depends on both the type of cell and the species of organism it belongs to. Most cells of adult mammals spend about 24 hours in interphase; this accounts for about 90%-96% of the total time involved in cell division. Interphase includes G1, S, and G2 phases. Mitosis and cytokinesis, however, are separate from interphase.

DNA double-strand breaks can be repaired during interphase by two principal processes. The first process, non-homologous end joining (NHEJ), can join the two broken ends of DNA in the G1, S and G2 phases of interphase. The second process, homologous recombinational repair (HRR), is more accurate than NHEJ in repairing double-strand breaks. However HRR is only active during the S and G2 phases of interphase when DNA replication is either partially or fully accomplished, since HRR requires two adjacent homologous chromosomes.

== Interphase within sequences of cellular processes ==
=== Interphase and the cell cycle ===
When G_{2} is completed, the cell enters a relatively brief period of nuclear and cellular division, composed of mitosis and cytokinesis, respectively. After the successful completion of mitosis and cytokinesis, both resulting daughter cells re-enter G_{1} of interphase.

In the cell cycle, interphase is preceded by telophase and cytokinesis of the M phase. In alternative fashion, interphase is sometimes interrupted by G_{0} phase, which, in some circumstances, may then end and be followed by the remaining stages of interphase. After the successful completion of the G_{2} checkpoint, the final checkpoint in interphase, the cell proceeds to prophase, or in plants to preprophase, which is the first stage of mitosis.

G_{0} phase is viewed as either an extended G_{1} phase where the cell is neither dividing nor preparing to divide, or as a distinct quiescent stage which occurs outside of the cell cycle.

=== Interphase and other cellular processes ===
In gamete production, interphase is succeeded by meiosis. In programmed cell death, interphase is followed or preempted by apoptosis.

== See also ==
- Prophase
- Prometaphase
- Metaphase
- Anaphase
- Telophase
- Cytokinesis
- Cytoskeleton
