= Cell plate =

Structure in dividing plant cells

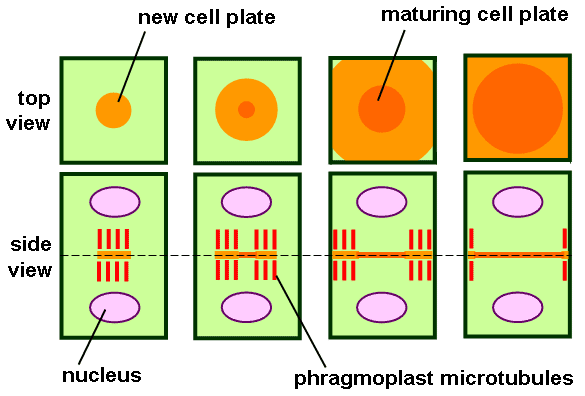
Phragmoplast and cell plate formation in a plant cell during cytokinesis. Left side: Phragmoplast forms and cell plate starts to assemble in the center of the cell. Towards the right: Phragmoplast enlarges in a donut-shape towards the outside of the cell, leaving behind mature cell plate in the center. The cell plate will transform into the new cell wall once cytokinesis is complete.

Cytokinesis in terrestrial plants occurs by cell plate formation. This process entails the delivery of Golgi-derived and endosomal vesicles carrying cell wall and cell membrane components to the plane of cell division and the subsequent fusion of these vesicles within this plate.

After formation of an early tubulo-vesicular network at the center of the cell, the initially labile cell plate consolidates into a tubular network and eventually a fenestrated sheet. The cell plate grows outward from the center of the cell to the parental plasma membrane with which it will fuse, thus completing cell division. Formation and growth of the cell plate is dependent upon the phragmoplast, which is required for proper targeting of Golgi-derived vesicles to the cell plate.

As the cell plate matures in the central part of the cell, the phragmoplast disassembles in this region and new elements are added on its outside. This process leads to a steady expansion of the phragmoplast and, concomitantly, to a continuous retargeting of Golgi-derived vesicles to the growing edge of the cell plate. Once the cell plate reaches and fuses with the plasma membrane the phragmoplast disappears. This event not only marks the separation of the two daughter cells, but also initiates a range of biochemical modifications that transform the callose-rich, flexible cell plate into a cellulose-rich, stiff primary cell wall.

The heavy dependence of cell plate formation on active Golgi stacks explains why plant cells, unlike animal cells, do not disassemble their secretion machinery during cell division.

== Cytokinesis and building of the cell plate in plants ==
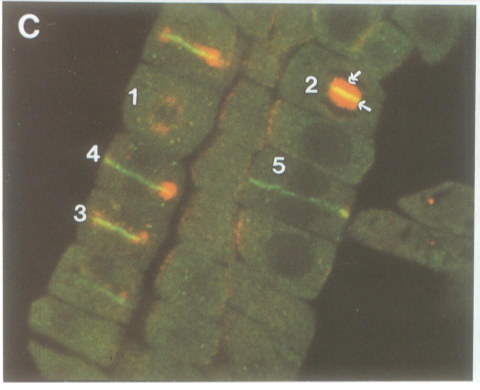
Confocal visualization of phragmoplasts by double labeling immunofluorescence microscopy.

Our current understanding of various mechanisms involved in budding-off of Golgi vesicles, delivery and fusion of vesicles to initiate plant cell plate during cytokinesis and the synthesis of polysaccharides at the forming cell plate is very limited (Figure 1). Little is known about the molecular mechanisms involved in determining the site, direction, fusion and the point of attachment of the growing cell plate with the parental cell wall. These gaps may be filled soon, as many genes that have been identified by mutations are analyzed and functions of their products are deciphered.

== Phragmoplastin ==
Cytokinesis in a plant cell is accomplished by the formation of a cell plate in the center of the a dynamin-like protein named phragmoplastin which was identified in soybean and demonstrated that this protein is associated with the formation of the cell plate during cytokinesis in plant cells. Indirect immunofluorescence microscopy localized phragmoplastin to the cell plate in dividing soybean root tip cells. Double labeling experiments demonstrated that, unlike phragmoplast microtubules which are concentrated on the periphery of the forming plate, PDL is located across the whole width of the newly formed cell plate. Other homologs of this protein were later identified indicating a whole family of proteins with variable structure and these proteins are involved both in tubulation and pinching of vesicles wall as pinching of chloroplasts, mitochondria, and peroxisomes.

The role of phragmoplastin in creating tubules from vesicles is unique in that it wraps around the vesicle fusion neck and creates a tube. These tubular dumbbell-shaped structures when fuse end to end creating a tubular network which is first filled with callose and then with cellulose. A cell plate specific callose synthase is involved in this process
