= PROSER3 =

Protein-coding gene found in humans

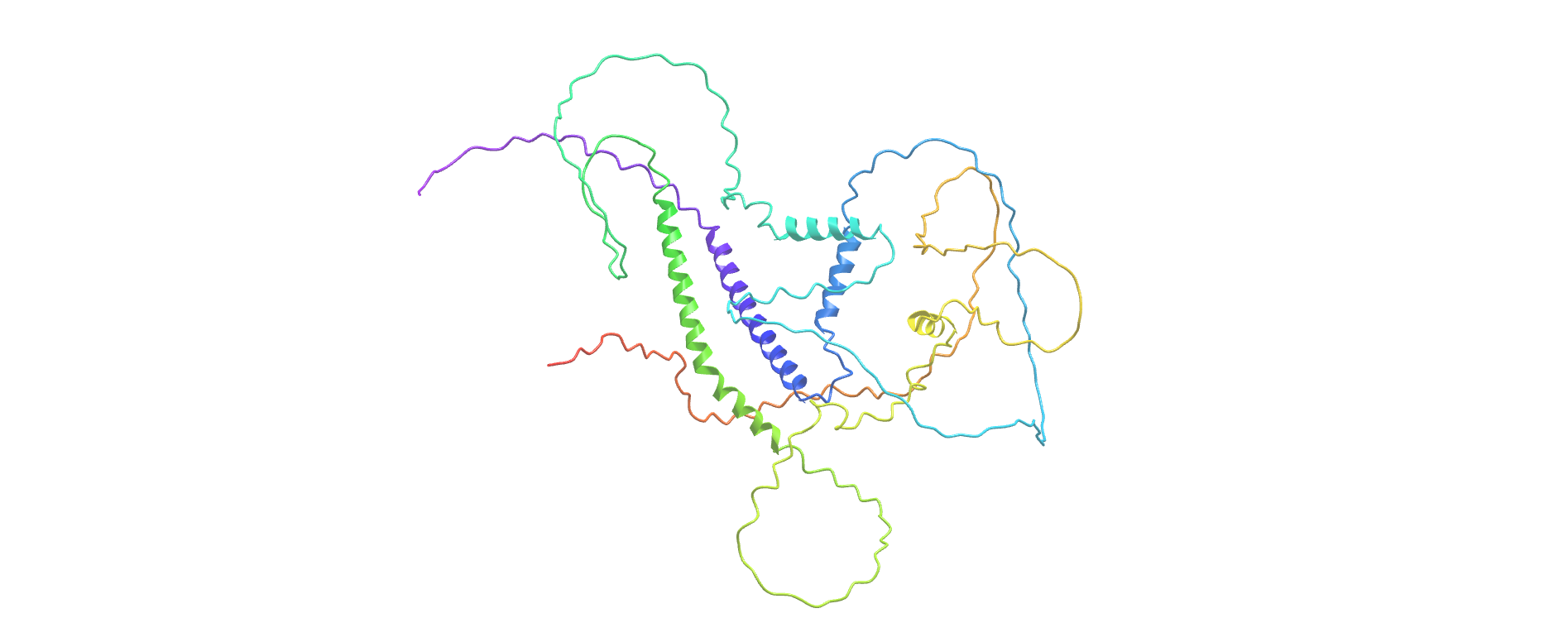

Identifiers
- Aliases: PROSER3, C19orf55, proline and serine rich 3
- External IDs: MGI: 2681861; GeneCards: PROSER3

Gene location (Human)
Chr.	Chromosome 19 (human)
Band	19q13.12	Start	35,758,143 bp
Band	19q13.12	End	35,771,028 bp

Gene location (Mouse)
Chr.	Chromosome 7 (mouse)
Band	7|7 B1	Start	30,238,559 bp
Band	7|7 B1	End	30,251,724 bp
RNA expression pattern
Bgee	Human / Mouse (ortholog); Top expressed in: buccal mucosa cell; right uterine tube; left testis; right testis; sural nerve; stromal cell of endometrium; body of uterus; right ovary; left ovary; left uterine tube / Top expressed in: genital tubercle; tail of embryo; ventricular zone; thymus; zygote; bone marrow; testicle; ganglionic eminence; secondary oocyte; yolk sac; More reference expression data
BioGPS	n/a
Orthologs
Databases	NCBI: entry; OMA: entry
Species	Human	Mouse
Entrez	148137	333193
Ensembl	ENSG00000167595	ENSMUSG00000036864
UniProt	Q2NL68	Q7TSA6
RefSeq (mRNA)	NM_001039887; NM_144692; NM_001367856	NM_183321; NM_001374643; NM_001382459
RefSeq (protein)	NP_001034976; NP_001354785	NP_899144; NP_001361572; NP_001369388
Location (UCSC)	Chr 19: 35.76 – 35.77 Mb	Chr 7: 30.24 – 30.25 Mb
PubMed search
- Wikidata
View/Edit Human	View/Edit Mouse

Proline and serine-rich protein 3 is a protein that in humans is encoded by the gene PROSER3 (previously C19orf55).

== Gene ==
PROSER3 is found on the plus strand of chromosome 19 at gene locus q.13.12 at the span of 12,991 base pairs, see Figure "Ideogram of chromosome 19 showing PROSER3 in Humans". There are no paralogs of this gene, and it does not interact with any of its immediate gene neighborhood. In an analysis of human tissue expression, PROSER3 was found to be expressed ubiquitously at low levels with up to 30-fold expression level variation among tissues. PROSER3 takes part in regulating cell growth and apoptosis in papillary thyroid cancer (PTC) cells, and targeting it can enhance treatment efficacy and decrease PTC recurrence. The probability of PROSER3 having a role in centrosome function is considerable.

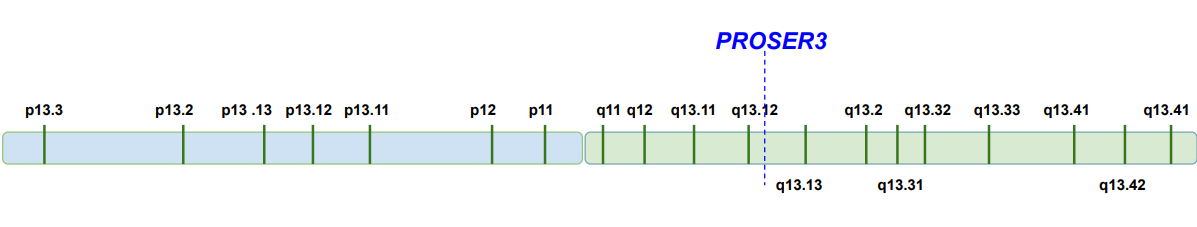
Ideogram of Chromosome 19 Showing PROSER3 in Humans

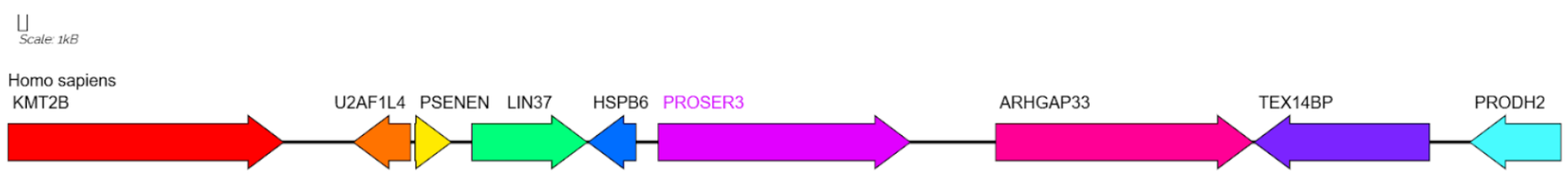
Gene Neighborhood of PROSER3 in Humans

== mRNA ==
There are 10 exons contained within PROSER3's mRNA sequence as well as 28 different mRNA variations. Some features of isoform 2 include a major polyA site, an alternative polyA site, and 3 disordered regions once translated.^{5}

== Protein ==
The Proline and Serine-rich 3 protein in Homo sapiens is encoded by the PROSER3 gene. A FASTA translation in NCBI reveals that the protein-coding sequence produces 101 serine and 116 proline amino acids out of a total of 724 amino acids within that protein-coding sequence. The protein is localized to the Golgi apparatus as well as co-localized with γ-tubulin or pericentrin (PCNT) in the centrosome, suggesting Proline and Serine-rich 3 is a centrosome component.^{5,} In mammalian cells, the centrosome and Golgi apparatus are closely positioned during interphase and have a functional relationship. The Golgi apparatus transports vesicles via microtubules arranged by the centrosome, and the positioning of the centrosome influences the organization of the Golgi apparatus, which is critical for cell polarization and migration and suggests potential significance of PROSER3's role in it. The PROSER3 protein has two partial homologous amino acid sequences that are well conserved in bacteria and viruses. One is the UL36 tegument protein, while the other is the DNA polymerase III subunit gamma/tau.

The UL36 tegument protein, which is present in viruses such as the Herpes Simplex Virus 1, includes residues linked to catalysis and is known to actively deubiquitinate host cells in vitro. Ubiquitination is essential for proteolysis and cell cycle control, both of which play vital roles in centrosome formation.

DNA polymerase III subunits gamma/tau in E. coli create a highly effective replication apparatus that concurrently duplicates both strands of the duplex DNA by assembling the core interface that joins two DNA polymerases with a single clamp-loading complex that is responsible for quick and precise DNA replication. In order to control microtubule stability, dynamics, and cytoskeletal architecture, tau, a microtubule-associated protein, possesses microtubule-binding domains that rely on sequence motifs and helices to mediate interactions with tubulin.

== Gene ontology ==
Mature microRNA hsa-miR-212-5p is involved in miRNA-mediated post-transcriptional gene silencing, negative regulation of canonical Wnt signaling pathway, and enables mRNA base-pairing translational repressor activity.

Table 1. Conserved Sites of hsa-miR-212-5p for miRNA families broadly conserved among vertebrates
Conservation	Site Type	Position	Pairing
High	7mer-A1	113-119	CCAAGGA GGUUCCA
Poor	7mer-m8	257-263	GCCAAGG CGGUUCC
Poor	7mer-m8	2676-2682	GCCAAGG CGGUUCC
Poor	7mer-m8	3220-3226	GCCAAGG CGGUUCC

== Evolutionary aspects ==
PROSER3 retains sequence identity exclusively with the domain Eukarya, specifically the animal kingdom and, more precisely, one of the oldest invertebrates: sponges. The bacteria and archaea domains have no sequence identity, nor do the protists, plants, or fungi kingdoms. It is expected that the PROSER3 gene first arose around 758 million years ago. PROSER3 has no gene family.

PROSER3 orthologs are found in every extant class of vertebrates except birds and crocodiles, and partial orthologs are found in certain invertebrates. In decreasing order of divergence, these invertebrates include Sponges (Porifera), Mollusks, Cnidaria, and Echinoderms.

=== Orthologs ===
Non-primate orthologs of PROSER3 were found below 60% sequence identity and 64% sequence similarity. Although the Mammalia class has an identity and similarity score of more than 30%, the range is very wide, going from 30% to 99%. Taxonomic classes prior to Mammalia have lower similarity and identity scores, although this range is narrower despite the larger divergence (439 million years ago) compared to Mammalia's 160 million years of diversification.

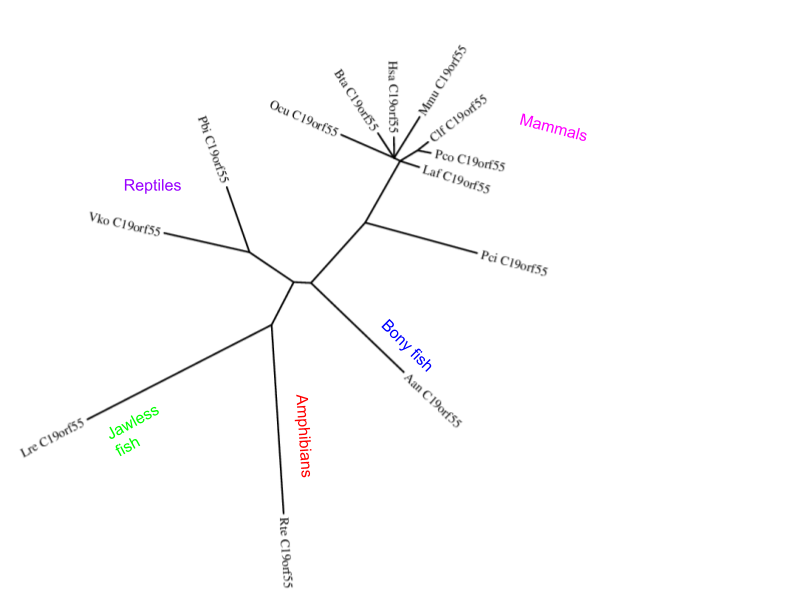
Evolutionary Divergence in orthologs of PROSER3 including the following: puma, elephant, eel, rabbit, koala, house mouse, cow, sheep, Komodo dragon, river lamprey, common frog, and Burmese python.

Table 2. Orthologs of PROSER3 protein in order of increasing divergence from Homo sapiens
Taxonomic Class	Genus and species	Common name	Taxonomic Order	Date of Divergence (MYA)	Ascension number	Sequence length (aa)	Sequence identity (%)	Sequence similarity (%)
Mammailia	Homo sapians	Human	Primates	0	AAI10894.1	480	100	100
Mammailia	Gorilla gorilla gorilla	Gorilla	Primates	8.6	XP_055224997.1	770	91.7	92.6
Mammailia	Oryctolagus cuniculus	Rabbit	Lagomorpha	87	XP_051692036.1	710	40.2	44.5
Mammailia	Mus musculus	House Mouse	Rodentia	87	NP_001361572.1	660	34.2	39.9
Mammailia	Bos taurus	Domestic Cow	Artiodactyla	94	XP_024834460.1	666	34.3	38.8
Mammailia	Ovis aries	Sheep	Artiodactyla	94	XP_027833195.2	687	35.3	39.4
Mammailia	Canis lupus familiaris	Dog	Carnivora	94	XP_038513300.1	823	33	37.5
Mammailia	Puma concolor	Puma	Carnivora	94	XP_025770589.1	485	56.8	64
Mammailia	Loxodonta africana	African Elephant	Proboscidea	99	XP_064149597.1	574	30.8	34.7
Mammailia	Phascolarctos cinereus	Koala	Diprotodontia	160	XP_020832844.1	643	27.6	34.5
Reptilia	Varanus komodoensis	Komodo Dragon	Squamata	319	XP_044291264.1	615	24	33.4
Reptilia	Python bivittatus	Burmease Python	Squamata	319	XP_007430618.1	619	24.8	34
Amphibia	Rana temporaria	Frog	Anura	352	XP_040183035.1	568	26	35.7
Amphibia	Rhinatrema bivittatum	Two-lined caecilian	Gymnophiona	352	XP_029432023.1	688	23.7	32.4
Actinopterygii	Anguilla anguilla	European Eel	Anguilliformes	429	XP_035286751.1	703	22.4	28.9
Actinopterygii	Lethenteron reissneri	River Lampray	Petromyzontiformes	563	XP_061407033.1	735	20.1	30.2
Asteroidea	Acanthaster planci	Starfish	Valvatida	619	XP_022088550	887	15.5	20.7
Anthozoa	Exaiptasia diaphana	Brown Anemone	Actiniaria	685	KXJ13057	635	21.2	28.9
Gastropoda	Haliotis rubra	Abalone	Lepetellida	686	XP_046554919	816	17.4	23.2
Homoscleromorpha	Oscarella lobularis	Sponge	Homosclerophorida	758	XM_065990070	530	18.9	25.8

=== Protein divergence ===
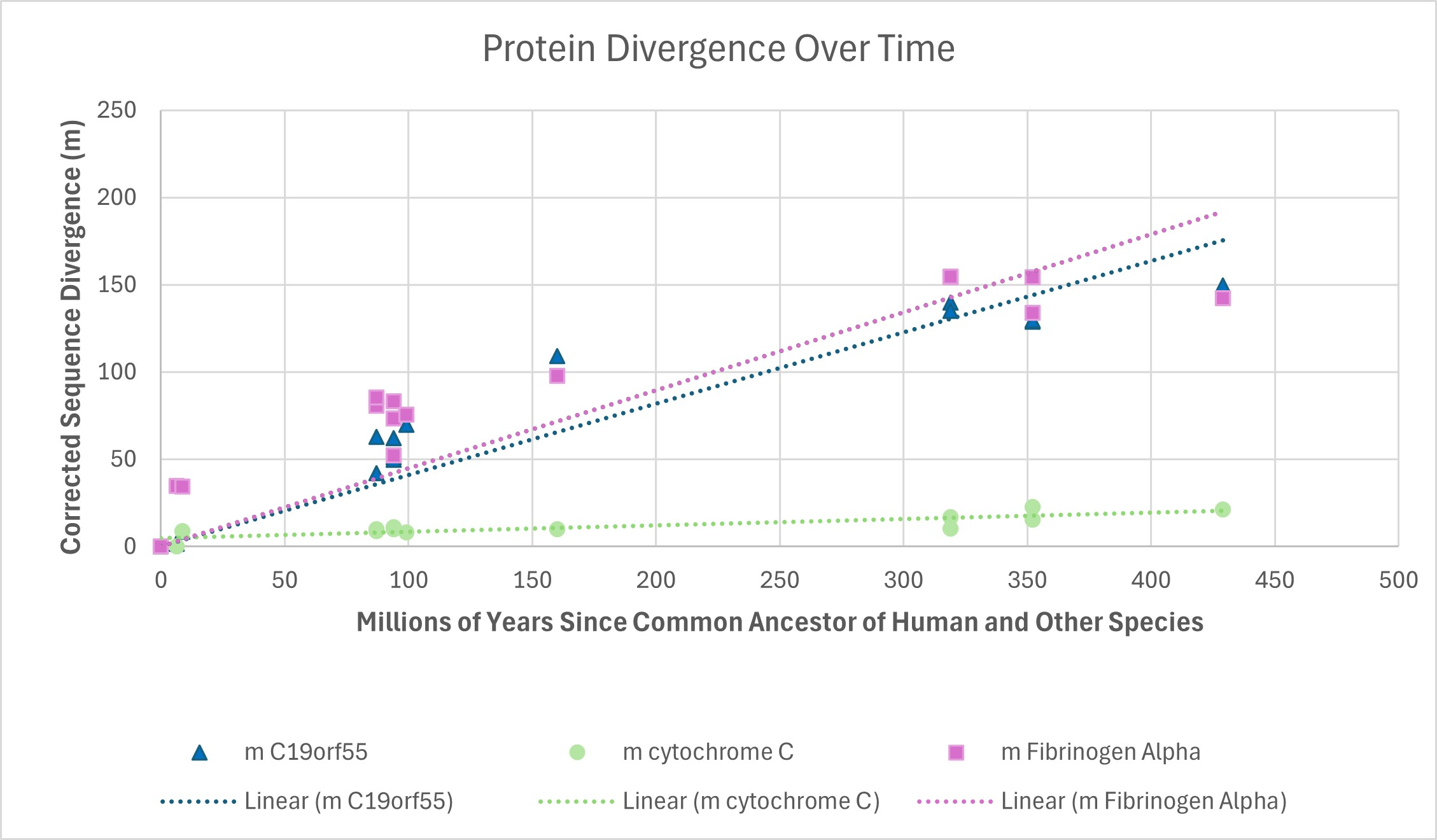
Informational Context of PROSER3 Human Protein in Comparison to Cytochrome C and Fibrinogen Alpha Through Alignment of 15 Orthologs

In the figure titled "Informational context of PROSER3 human protein..." the human PROSER3 protein, in contrast to the conserved m cytochrome C—as seen by its lower slope— is evolving quickly over time similar to fibrinogen alpha. However, fibrinogen alpha continues to evolve more quickly than the PROSER3 protein.

=== Multiple sequence alignment ===
Exon 2 at amino acid K is in a highly conserved/unchanged amino acid sequence VVAKYI between aa 170 and 180. The following are highly conserved unchanged amino acid sequences even in distant orthologs: FWWL at aa 206 and DDILYQWR...RRKLEQA at aa 463. The figures titled "Multiple Sequence Alignment of Distant PROSER3 Orthologs" show a snippet of the most important conserved regions in the PROSER3 protein.

== Protein analysis ==
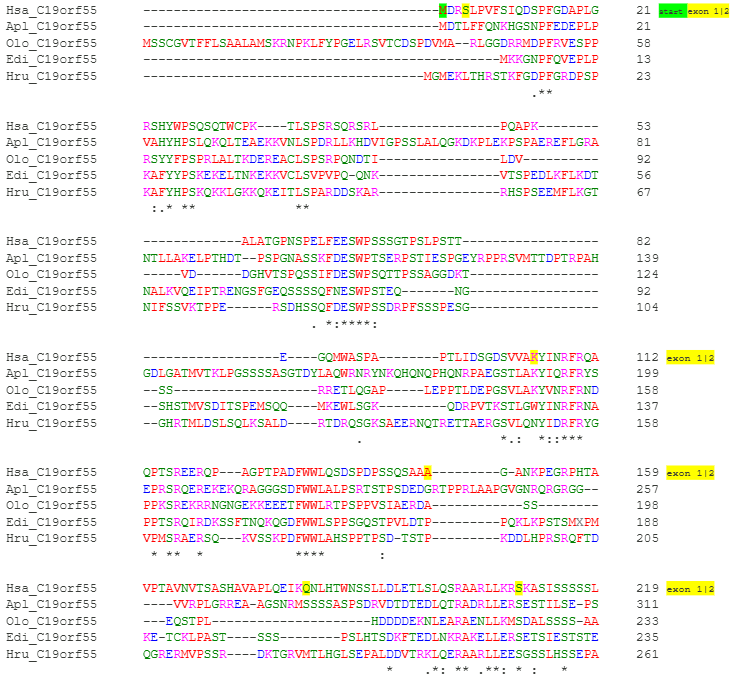
Multiple Sequence Alignment of Distant PROSER3 Orthologs pt.1

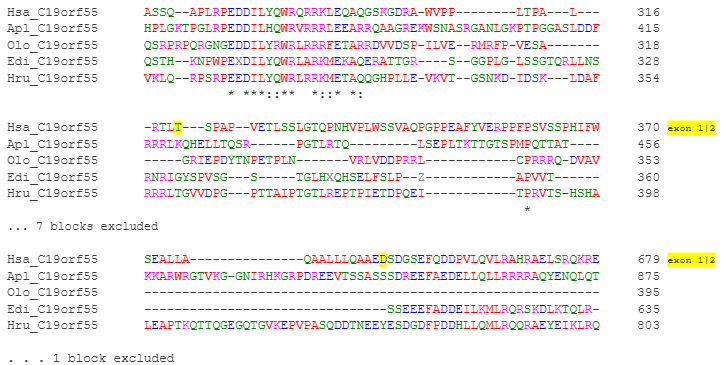
Multiple Sequence Alignment of Distant PROSER3 Orthologs pt.2

All proteins that are known to physically interact with PROSER3 exhibit a shared consensus. Based on their functions and subcellular localizations, PROSER3 plays a role in centriole biogenesis and the organization of microtubules. PROSER3 protein's subcellular location is likely on top of the Golgi apparatus. Further research into microtubule organization and location reveals that there are two microtubule populations, axonemal microtubules and cytoplasmic microtubules. Microtubule plus ends grow out from the microtubule-organizing center nucleated by the basal body and the minus ends are tethered to the adjacent centriole at the base of the connecting cilium. There are only four types of proteins that interact non-physically. The three proteins CEP128, CEP135, and NINL are proximity-based interaction types, while MIF is an association-type interaction. Considering the subcellular location of these interaction proteins is either near or in the same area where PROSER3 protein localizes, and because the activities of these interaction proteins are extremely similar to the hypothesized function of PROSER3 protein, there is a strong probability that these protein interactions with PROSER3 protein are real. Proving these interactions could be done with co-immunoprecipitation to pull the target protein out of a cell lysate along with any proteins bound to it, forming a protein complex that can then be analyzed by western blotting. Additionally, co-expression of the Proline and Serine-rich 3 protein is observed with proteins coded by the genes C19orf44, CFAP100, DNAAF3, CCDC38, and C10orf67, indicating these proteins may be functionally related or involved in similar biological processes. Co-expression between PROSER3 and C19orf44 is accompanied by a strong correlation in the co-occurrence, indicating a potential functional link between the two.

Table 3. Physical protein interactions with human PROSER3
Protein	IDs	Identification	Function	Subcellular Location
Centrosomal Protein of 135 kDa	CEP135	Proximity Label-MS	Centrosomal microtubule-binding protein acting as a scaffolding protein in centriole biogenesis.	Centriole, Centrosome, Microtubule Organizing Center
Ninein-like Protein	NINL	Proximity Label-MS	Microtubule organization in interphase cells, overexpression induces fragmentation of the Golgi + lysosome dispersal.	Centriole, Centrosome, Microtubule Organizing Center
Centrosomal Protein of 128 kDa	CEP128	Proximity Label-MS	Organelle assembly, microtubule organization.	Centriole, Centrosome, Microtubule Organizing Center
Nucleoside Diphosphate Kinase Homolog 7	NME7	Two-hybrid array	Component of the gamma-tubulin ring complex, implicated in the regulation of microtubule-nucleating activity in Centrosome. DMT is implicated in motile cilia beating.	Centriole, Centrosome, Microtubule Organizing Center, Nucleus, Cilium Axoneme
Coiled-coil Alpha-helical Rod Protein 1	CCHCR1	Two-hybrid array	May be a regulator of keratinocyte proliferation or differentiation.	Centriole
IQ Domain-containing Protein C	IQCC	Two-hybrid array	N/A	N/A
Coiled-coil Domain Containing Protein 146	CCDC146	Two-hybrid array	Sperm flagellum biogenesis and male fertility.	Centriole, Centrosome, Flagellum, Microtubule Organizing Center
Cell Division Cycle Protein 23 Homolog	CDC23	Two-hybrid array	Component of anaphase-promoting complex/cyclosome.	Cytosol, Nucleoplasm
Zinc Finger Protein 396	ZNF396	Two-hybrid array	May act as a DNA-dependent transcriptional repressor.	Nucleus, Cytoplasm
Coiled-coil Domain-containing Protein 57	CCDC57	Two-hybrid array	Pleiotropic regulator of centriole duplication, mitosis, and ciliogenesis. Localizes to and interacts with microtubules.	Centriole, Centrosome, Spindle, Microtubule Organizing Center
ELAV-like Protein 1	ELAVL1	Affinity Capture-RNA	RNA binding protein binding to poly U elements, AU-rich elements in 3' UTR, increasing stability. ESC differentiation preferentially binds non-methylated mRNAs.	Cytoplasm, Nucleus, Stress Granule, P-body
Replicase Polyprotein 1ab (SARS-CoV-2)	NSP12AB	Affinity Capture-MS	Viral proliferation: Transcription and replication of viral RNAs, has proteinases for cleavage of polyprotein. Inhibits host translation by endonucleolytic cleavage near 5' UTR of host mRNA. Modifies viral mRNA caps for immune evasion.	Host Cytoplasm, Endosome, Golgi Apparatus, ER
Nesprin-3	SYNE3	Proximity Label-MS	Component linker of nucleoskeleton and cytoskeleton complex, involved in nucleocytoplasmic interactions and mechanical forces across the nuclear envelope, nuclear movement, and positioning. Regulation of aortic epithelial cell morphology. Required for flow-induced Centrosome polarization and directional migration in aortic endothelial cells.	Perinuclear space, Rough ER, Nucleus Envelope, Nucleus Outer Membrane
Ninein	NIN	Proximity Label-MS	Centrosomal protein required in positioning and anchorage of microtubule minus-end to mother centriole in epithelial cells.	Centrosome, Microtubule Organizing Center, Centriole
Macrophage Migration Inhibitory Factor	MIF	Affinity Capture-MS	Pro-inflammatory cytokine mediator secreted by macrophages in response to bacterial pathogen LPS.	Secreted, Cytoplasm
Cell Migration-inducing and Hyaluronan-binding Protein	CEMIP	Affinity Capture-MS	Mediates depolymerization of hyaluronic acid via clathrin-coated pit endocytic pathway. Positively regulates epithelial-mesenchymal transition, and promotes cancer cell dissemination, invasion, and growth.	Nucleus, ER, Secreted, Cytoplasm
Mex-3 RNA Binding Family Member B	MEX3B	Proximity Label-MS	May be involved in post-transcriptional regulatory mechanisms.	Cytoplasmic Granule, P-body, Cytosol, Nucleoplasm
Bicaudal D Homolog 1 (Drosophila)	BICD1	Proximity Label-MS	Regulates coat complex coatomer protein 1 independent Golgi- ER transport by recruiting dynein-dynactin motor complex.	Golgi Apparatus, Centrosome, Cytoplasmic vesicle, Cytosol
SAGA-associated Factor 29	SGF29/ CCDC101	Two-hybrid array	Chromatin reader component of histone acetyltransferase, recognizes and binds methylated Lys-4 of histone H3. Involved in ER stress response, recruiting SAGA complex.	Nucleoplasm, Mitotic Spindle

== Conceptual translation ==
Conceptual Translation of PROSER3 human gene and protein (isoform 2) with PTMs, 3D structures, and other annotations

Depicted on the right is a PDF for the conceptual translation of the human PROSER3 isoform 2 (full mRNA) with annotations to the right-hand side.

== Snps ==
There are 6413 SNPs catalogued in NCBI's Variation Viewer, none of which have publications or clinical significance records. rs1187661251 is a single nucleotide variant that overlaps with the conserved region VVAKYI and, when mutated, prevents the RNA-binding protein FUS from binding. Potential resulting side effects may include promotion of neurodegenerative diseases like ALS or FTLD, neuronal dysfunction, decreased damage response signaling and repair, and RNA dysregulation. rs1971047914 is a C insertion variant overlapping the transcription factor ZNF384 (Cys_{2}His_{2} zinc finger factors) and RNA-binding protein ELAVL2 which may have potential significance for chromatin remodeling and neuronal differentiation/function. If mutated by the C insertion, ZNF384 would no longer be able to bind to the DNA sequence and downregulate the cell's ability to remodel chromatin, initiating or promoting oncogenesis. Additionally, ELAVL2 would lose its ability to bind, which could result in risk-associated diseases such as frontotemporal dementia/ALS and lung cancer.

== Further links and articles ==
- AlphaFold can be used to predict the tertiary structure of the PROSER3 protein.
