= Wybutosine =

Names
- IUPAC name Methyl (2S)-4-(3,4″-dimethyl-3H-imidazo[1″,2″:1,2]inosin-5″-yl)-2-[(methoxycarbonyl)amino]butanoate
- Systematic IUPAC name Methyl (2S)-4-{3-[(2R,3R,4S,5R)-3,4-dihydroxy-5-(hydroxymethyl)oxolan-2-yl]-4,6-dimethyl-9-oxo-4,9-dihydro-3H-imidazo[1,2-a]purin-7-yl}-2-[(methoxycarbonyl)amino]butanoate
- Other names: 7-{(3S)-4-methoxy-3-[(methoxycarbonyl)amino]-4-oxobutyl}-4,6-dimethyl-3-(β-D-ribofuranosyl)-3,4-dihydro-9H-imidazo[1,2-a]purin-9-one (CHEBI); methyl 4-{3-[3,4-dihydroxy-5-(hydroxymethyl)dihydrofuran-2(3H)-yl]-4-methyl-6-methyl-8-oxo-1,3,4,5,7a-pentaaza-4,8-dihydro-3H-s-indacen-7-yl}-2-[methyl(oxycarbonylamino)]butanoate (ChemDoodle)

Identifiers
CAS Number	55196-46-8
3D model (JSmol)	Interactive image
Abbreviations	yW
ChEBI	CHEBI:46574
ChemSpider	28184605
PubChem CID	14135916
UNII	5PCY5AS87Q
CompTox Dashboard (EPA)	DTXSID401030490
- InChI: Key: QAOHCFGKCWTBGC-QHOAOGIMSA-N; InChI=1S/C21H28N6O9/c1-9-11(6-5-10(19(32)34-3)24-21(33)35-4)27-17(31)13-16(25(2)20(27)23-9)26(8-22-13)18-15(30)14(29)12(7-28)36-18/h8,10,12,14-15,18,28-30H,5-7H2,1-4H3,(H,24,33)/t10-,12+,14+,15+,18+/m0/s1
- SMILES: Cc1c(n2c(=O)c3c(n(c2n1)C)n(cn3)[C@H]4[C@@H]([C@@H]([C@H](O4)CO)O)O)CC[C@@H](C(=O)OC)NC(=O)OC

Properties
Chemical formula	C_{21}H_{28}N_{6}O_{9}
Molar mass	508.488 g·mol^{−1}
- Except where otherwise noted, data are given for materials in their standard state (at 25 °C [77 °F], 100 kPa). Infobox references

In biochemistry, wybutosine (yW) is a heavily modified nucleoside of phenylalanine transfer RNA that stabilizes interactions between the codons and anti-codons during protein synthesis. Ensuring accurate synthesis of protein is essential in maintaining health as defects in tRNA modifications are able to cause disease. In eukaryotic organisms, it is found only in position 37, 3'-adjacent to the anticodon, of phenylalanine tRNA. Wybutosine enables correct translation through the stabilization of the codon-anticodon base pairing during the decoding process.

== Biosynthesis ==
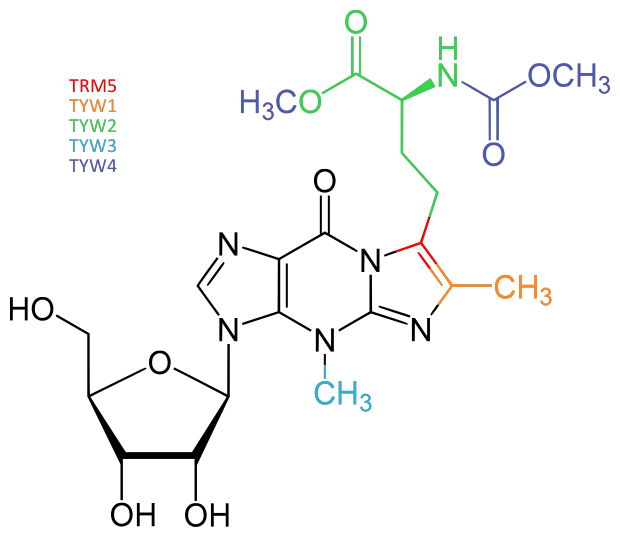
Wybutosine and enzymes that aid in its biosynthesis. Each enzyme and group is highlighted using colors.

Wybutosine is produced from guanosine in several steps. All steps directly act on the number 37 site of tRNA^{Phe}.

1. tRNA (guanine^{37}-N^{1})-methyltransferase (yeast TRM5, human TRMT5) converts G37 to m^{1}G37.
2. S-adenosyl-L-methionine-dependent tRNA 4-demethylwyosine synthase (TYW1), using pyruvate as a C-3 source, forms the tricyclic core of wybutosine with flavin mononucleotide (FMN) as a cofactor. The result is called 4-demethylwyosine (abbreviation symbol imG-14, standing for "imidazomethylguanosine minus 14", or yW-187, for "wybutosine minus 187"). The "minus" indicates that the molecular mass is this many units lower than the derived compound being named.
3. tRNA(Phe) (4-demethylwyosine(37)-C(7)) aminocarboxypropyltransferase (yeast TYW2, human TRMT12) transfers the α-amino-α-carboxypropyl group from Ado-Met, a common substrate involved in methyl group transfers, to the lateral side chain at the C-7 position of imG/yW-187 to form yW-86.
4. tRNA^{Phe} 7-[(3-amino-3-carboxypropyl)-4-demethylwyosine^{37}-N^{4}]-methyltransferase (TYW3) acts as a catalyst for N-4 methylation of yW-86 to produce yW-72.
5. TYW4 methylates the α-carboxy group of yW-72 to give yW-57.
6. TYW4 performs methoxycarbonylation of the α-amino group of the yW-58 side chain to give wybutosine.

=== Variation ===
Most eukaryotes have the entire pathway from TRM5 to TYW4. Variants occur by adding or removing steps:

- Torulopsis utilis exhibits hypomodification and uses the wyosine (imG) instead, produced by TYW1 directly followed by TYW3.
- Another hypomodified version of OHyW called OHyW* (less ambiguously OHyW-72) is present in cancer cells. It appears to be made by having TYW5 act on yW-72.
  - Hydroxywybutosine (OHyW) replaces a hydrogen on the β carbon of yW with a hydroxyl group. It is made by having TYW4 act on OHyW-72.
  - Hydroperoxywybutosine (o2yW) has been isolated form plants and animal liver, differing from OHyW by having a hydroperoxyl sidechain instead. As o2yw can form from OHyW during sample preparation, it is unclear whether o2yW is just an unnatural artifact of experimentation.
- Other types of cancer cells as well as normal non-mammalian cells use m^{1}G instead.
- Most eukaryotes do not use a wyosine derivative in the mitochondria and instead uses a bacterial-style modification. However, the kinetoplastids have lost all of their mitochondrial tRNA genes; as a result they import nuclear tRNA and a special paralogous version of TyW1 as well. The end result seems to contain OHyW and imG.

Eukaryotes likely descended from the fusion of an archaeon host cell and a proto-mitochondrion bacterial symbioant. Most archaeons have homologs of Trm5, Tyw1, and Tyw3, called aTrm5, Taw1, and Taw3 respectively. Some have a homolog of Tyw2 called Taw. Based on the distribution of these enzymes among archaeal taxa, it is likely the ancestral archaeon already had these enzymes. As a result, they also exhibit hypermodification of the G37 position of tRNA(Phe), although the lack of TRM4 prevents them from making wybutosine, so they use a different but similar base.

- Wyosine (imG) made from imG-14 is relatively common.
- Some enzymes in the Trm5a subfamily of Trm5 convert imG-14 into isomethylwyosine (imG2), with the methyl attached at the C7 position instead of the N4 position. It can then be converted into 7-methylwyosine (mimG) by enzymes of the Taw3c branch.
- The full eukaryote-like pathway (imG-14, yW-86, yW-72) is found in Pyrococcus abyssi.
- Haloferax volcanii is an outlier. It exhibits hypomodification, using just m^{1}G.

=== Verification by chemical synthesis ===
Wybutosine and hydroxywybutosine has been chemically synthesized, allowing researchers to compare them with what is presumed to be these substances derived from natural sources.

yW-86 and yW-72 are yet to be chemically synthesized. Their presence in tRNA is inferred from mass spectroscopy and their structure from that of the final yW.

== Function ==
=== Structural effect ===
When magnesium ions are present, wyobutosine causes a shift in the position in the anticodon loop. The hydrophobic nature of yW causes a preference of UUC over UUU, as Watson–Crick pairing with U is prevented.

=== Avoidance of frameshifting ===
Wybutosine and other unnatural nucleosides have been proposed to lead to a single outcome of hypermodification. This hypermodification at position 37 of tRNA^{Phe} may allow for base- stacking interactions which play a key role in maintenance of the reading frame. Through its large aromatic groups, stacking interactions with adjacent bases A36 and A38 are enhanced, which help to restrict the flexibility of the anticodon. It has been found that when tRNA^{Phe} lacks wybutosine, increased frameshifting occurs. Generally, modifications at position 37 prevent base pairing with neighboring nucleotides by helping to maintain and open the loop conformation, as well as generating an anticodon loop for decoding. A wyosine-type modification of tRNA^{Phe} is found to be conserved in archaea and eukarya but is not found in bacteria.

Studies from the 1960s and 1970s noted that many mutations could lead to problems in translational accuracy. Further study of the mechanisms involved in translational accuracy revealed the importance of modifications on positions 34 and 37 of tRNA. Regardless of species, these sites of tRNA are almost always modified. The fact that wybutosine and its various derivatives are only found at position 37 may be indicative of the nature of the phenylalanine codons, UUU and UUC, and their predilection for ribosome slippage. This has led to the assumption that tRNA^{Phe} modification at position 37 correlates with the amount of polyuridine slippery sequences found in genomes.

==== Alternatives ====
Besides the wyosine derivatives detailed above, these bases are also found in tRNA^{Phe} across different types of life:

- Isopentenyladenosine i^{6}A, some eukaryotes (cytoplasmic)
  - io^{6}A, ms^{2}i^{6}A, ms^{2}io^{6}A (ms indicated methylthiolation, o indicates hydroxylation [oxygen]), derivatives in some bacteria and some eukaryotic organelles
- Simple m^{1}G (some bacteria, some archaea, some eukaryotes)

==== Selective allowance of frameshifting? ====
Wybutosine's role in prevention of frameshifts has raised some questions into its importance, as there are other strategies beside modification with yW to prevent a shift: the simplistic m^{1}G also works to an extent. In Drosophila there is only m^{1}G at position 37 while in mammals yW is modified there. To explain this variability the idea of frameshifting potential has come about. This implies that cells use frameshifting as a mechanism to regulate themselves rather than trying to avoid frameshifting at all times. It has been suggested that frameshifting may be used in a programmed manner, possibly to increase coding diversity.

=== Downstream effects ===
The human gene SMARCAD1 contains many UUU codons. When human embryonic stem cells has the TYW1 gene knocked out, it can only make m^{1}G, causing lower translational efficiency of SMARCAD1. This leads to disinhibition of HERVK, preventing the cell from properly differentiating into a neuron.
