= Rootletin =

Protein found in humans

CROCC

Identifiers
- Aliases: CROCC, ROLT, ciliary rootlet coiled-coil, rootletin, TAX1BP2
- External IDs: OMIM: 615776; MGI: 3529431; HomoloGene: 16811; GeneCards: CROCC; OMA:CROCC - orthologs

Gene location (Human)
Chr.	Chromosome 1 (human)
Band	1p36.13	Start	16,740,273 bp
Band	1p36.13	End	16,972,964 bp

Gene location (Mouse)
Chr.	Chromosome 4 (mouse)
Band	4|4 D3	Start	140,743,948 bp
Band	4|4 D3	End	140,787,861 bp
RNA expression pattern
Bgee	Human / Mouse (ortholog); Top expressed in: right uterine tube; sural nerve; right hemisphere of cerebellum; olfactory zone of nasal mucosa; granulocyte; apex of heart; right ovary; canal of the cervix; left uterine tube; body of uterus / Top expressed in: neural layer of retina; superior frontal gyrus; lens; olfactory tubercle; retinal pigment epithelium; ventricular zone; otic vesicle; primary visual cortex; subiculum; epithelium of lens; More reference expression data
BioGPS	n/a
Gene ontology
Molecular function	structural molecule activity; protein binding; kinesin binding; actin binding
Cellular component	centrosome; photoreceptor inner segment; plasma membrane; ciliary rootlet; actin cytoskeleton; centriole; extracellular exosome; cytoskeleton; cytoplasm; cytosol; microtubule organizing center; cilium; cell projection
Biological process	protein localization to organelle; protein localization; epithelial structure maintenance; ciliary basal body organization; establishment of organelle localization; centriole-centriole cohesion; cell projection organization; cell cycle; photoreceptor cell maintenance; positive regulation of cilium assembly; positive regulation of protein localization to cilium; centrosome cycle
Sources:Amigo / QuickGO
Orthologs
Species	Human	Mouse
Entrez	9696	230872
Ensembl	ENSG00000058453	ENSMUSG00000040860
UniProt	Q5TZA2	Q8CJ40
RefSeq (mRNA)	NM_014675	NM_001145958; NM_172122
RefSeq (protein)	NP_055490	NP_001139430; NP_742120
Location (UCSC)	Chr 1: 16.74 – 16.97 Mb	Chr 4: 140.74 – 140.79 Mb
PubMed search
- Wikidata
View/Edit Human	View/Edit Mouse

Rootletin

Identifiers
- Symbol: Rootletin
- Pfam: PF15035
Available protein structures:
- Pfam: structures / ECOD
- PDB: RCSB PDB; PDBe; PDBj
- PDBsum: structure summary

Rootletin, also known as ciliary rootlet coiled-coil protein (CROCC) is a protein in humans that is encoded by the CROCC gene. Rootletin is a component of the ciliary rootlet and, together with CEP68 and CEP250, is required for centrosome cohesion.

Rootletin is an important protein in the ciliary rootlet, particularly for the structure and is considered important protein in mitosis as a centrosome linker.

== Function ==
This protein forms part of the ciliary rootlet structure. It also contributes to the centrosome cohesion before mitosis. Expression of rootletin leads to the formation of fibrous protein.

== Structure ==
This protein is part of the structure of a ciliary rootlet. This cytoskeletal-like structure starts from the basal body at one end of the cilium and extends towards the nucleus. Its molecular structure consists of a globular head domain and a tail domain made up of coiled-coil structures.

== Protein interactions ==
A large coiled-coil protein, C-Nap1, is a docking site for the fibrous tether to proximal ends of centrioles which Rootletin physically interacts with. Furthermore, Rootletin is phosphorylated by Nek2 kinase.
