= TMEM19 =

Human gene and protein

Identifiers
- Aliases: TMEM19, transmembrane protein 19
- External IDs: MGI: 1914476; GeneCards: TMEM19

Gene location (Human)
Chr.	Chromosome 12 (human)
Band	12q21.1	Start	71,686,082 bp
Band	12q21.1	End	71,705,047 bp

Gene location (Mouse)
Chr.	Chromosome 10 (mouse)
Band	10|10 D2	Start	115,175,579 bp
Band	10|10 D2	End	115,198,406 bp
RNA expression pattern
Bgee	Human / Mouse (ortholog); Top expressed in: mucosa of ileum; skin of arm; myocardium of left ventricle; cardiac muscle tissue of right atrium; jejunal mucosa; pancreatic ductal cell; duodenum; skin of thigh; skin of hip; bone marrow cell / Top expressed in: right kidney; proximal tubule; left lobe of liver; human kidney; epithelium of small intestine; stroma of bone marrow; duodenum; lip; intestinal villus; yolk sac; More reference expression data
BioGPS	n/a
Orthologs
Databases	NCBI: entry; OMA: entry
Species	Human	Mouse
Entrez	55266	67226
Ensembl	ENSG00000139291	ENSMUSG00000069520
UniProt	Q96HH6	Q91W52
RefSeq (mRNA)	NM_018279	NM_133683; NM_001359470; NM_001359471; NM_001359472
RefSeq (protein)	NP_060749	NP_598444; NP_001346399; NP_001346400; NP_001346401
Location (UCSC)	Chr 12: 71.69 – 71.71 Mb	Chr 10: 115.18 – 115.2 Mb
PubMed search
- Wikidata
View/Edit Human	View/Edit Mouse

Transmembrane protein 19 is a protein that in humans is encoded by the TMEM19 gene.

== Gene ==
TMEM19 location on chromosome 12

The TMEM19 gene is located on chromosome 12(12q21.1) spanning 18,966 base pairs on the + strand. The gene has a total of 6 exon regions.

Studies have found that after using single nucleotide polymorphism (SNP) genotyping array method the TMEM19 gene was identified to be associated with ammonia nitrogen tolerance. Using a genome-wide association study of individuals with non-syndromic cleft lip with palate (NSCLP) to identify loci that are at risk for the birth defect. From this they were able to identify the loci of TMEM19 as a risk for this birth defect, along with 25 other loci.

== Transcript ==
The mRNA transcript of TMEM19 is 5662 base pairs. The TMEM19 transcript was found to be expressed in most tissues but has increased expression in duodenum, kidney, skin, small intestine, and urinary bladder. in a non-alcoholic fatty liver disease (NAFLD) model in cells that were subjected to glucose deficiency or oxidative stress. This results in cell death due to excessive disulfide formation in actin cytoskeleton and actin filament called disulfidptosis.

A conceptual translation of the human TMEM19 was made using data from NCBI and translated using Six Frame Translations. Transmembrane regions are highlighted in gray, and highly conserved regions are bolded.

A conceptual translation of the human TMEM19 was made using data from NCBI and translated using Six Frame Translations. Transmembrane regions are highlighted in gray, and highly conserved regions are bolded.

A conceptual translation of the human TMEM19 was made using data from NCBI and translated using Six Frame Translations. Transmembrane regions are highlighted in gray, and highly conserved regions are bolded.

== Protein ==
TMEM19 is a protein spanning 336 amino acids. It has 6 transmembrane regions. The protein is found at moderate levels in the body, with the highest expression found in superior cervical ganglia and cardiac myocytes. TMEM19 interacts with many proteins, most of these proteins are localized around membranes found in the cell.

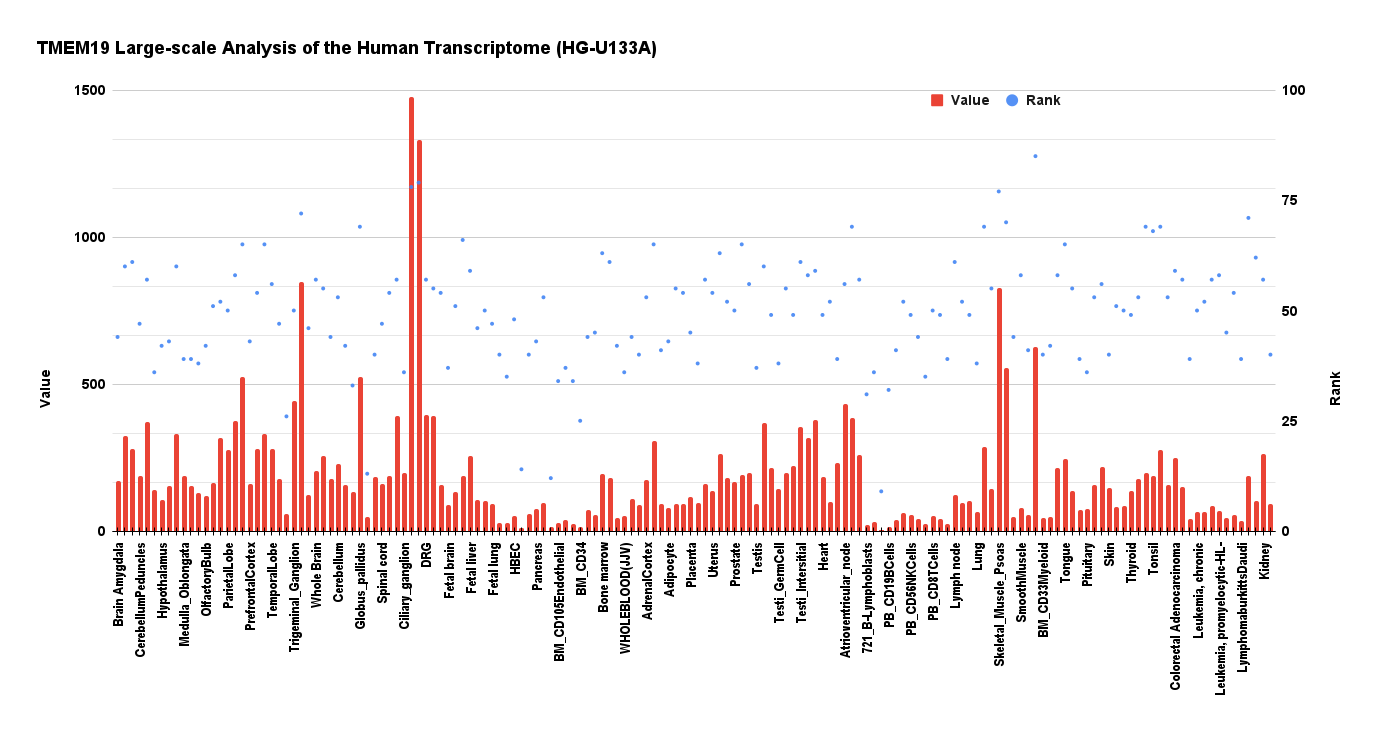
Data was obtained from a large-scale analysis of the human transcriptome on NCBI Geo. The data contains expression patterns of TMEM19 in different tissues in the body. The value in red shows the amount of expression and the blue dot signifies the rank of expression compared to other protein expression in tissues.

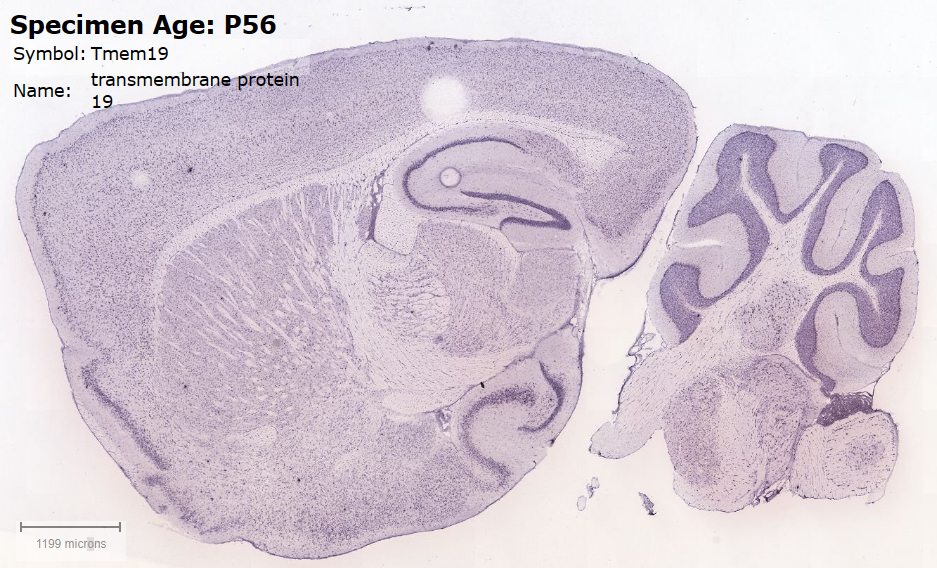
TMEM19 expression in Mus musculus brain. A sagittal slice of a mouse midbrain shows expression of TMEM19 shown in purple. The image was collected by the Allen Brain Map.

=== Protein Interactions ===
Protein	Full Name	Detection Method	Description	CV
MC4R	Melanocortin 4 Receptor	Ubiquitin Reconstruction	Membrane-bound receptor and member of the melanocortin receptor family. Protein interacts with adrenocorticotropic and MSH hormones. Mediated by G proteins. (NCBI)	0.37
BSCL2	Bernardinelli-Seip Congenital Lipodystrophy Type 2 Protein	Two Hybrid	Also known as Seipin, a multi-pass transmembrane protein. Localized in the ER and is predicted to be associated with lipid droplet morphology. Mutations of this gene leads to Berardinelli-Seip syndrome which results in absence of adipose tissue and severe insulin resistance. (NCBI)	0.67
APOA5	Apolipoprotein A5	Two Hybrid	Plays a role in regulating the plasma triglyceride levels, a major risk factor of CAD. Is a component of high-density lipoprotein, similar to a rat protein that is upregulated in response to liver injury. Mutations in the gene are associated with hypertriglyceridemia and hyperlipoproteinemia type 5. (NCBI)	0.56
AQP6	Aquaporin 6	Two Hybrid	Functions as a water channel in cells. Specific to the kidney. (NCBI)	0.56
C10orf67	Chromosome 10 open reading frame 67	Two Hybrid	Predicted to be located in mitochondrion. Possible link to Crohn's and sarcoidosis. (NCBI)	0.56
CD3G	CD3 gamma subunit of T-cell receptor complex	Two Hybrid	Component of the T-cell receptor-CD3 complex. Mutations with this protein are associated with T cell immunodeficiency. (NCBI)	0.56
CD79A	CD79a molecule	Two Hybrid	The Ig-alpha protein of the B-cell antigen component. (NCBI)	0.56
CNR2	Cannabinoid receptor 2	Two Hybrid	G protein-coupled receptor from cannabinoid family. Related to CB1 which is responsible for the efficacy of THC. Mainly expressed in cells of the immune system. (NCBI)	0.56
CPLX4	Complexin 4	Two Hybrid	May be involved in synaptic vesicle exocytosis. (NCBI)	0.56
CREB3	cAMP responsive element binding protein 3	Two Hybrid	Transcription factor that bind to cAMP-response element and regulates cell proliferation. Also plays a role in leukocyte migration, tumor suppression, and ER stress-associated protein degradation. (NCBI)	0.56
CREB3L1	cAMP responsive element binding protein 3 like 1	Two Hybrid	Normally found in the membrane of ER. Upon stress to ER the protein is cleaved and released into the cytoplasm where is translocated to the nucleus. It then activates the transcription of target genes by binding to box-B elements. (NCBI)	0.56

=== Post translational modifications ===
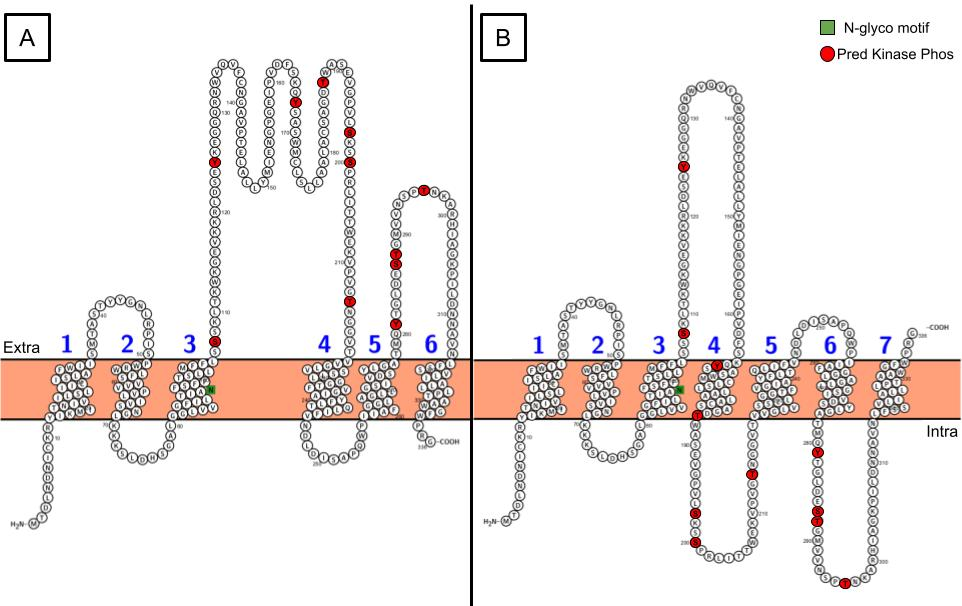
Visual predicted representation of TMEM19 in the cell membrane. In image A the transmembrane regions were selected using NCBI and in image B the seventh predicted transmembrane region found from SOSUI analysis was added. Amino acids in red are sites of kinase phosphorylation.

Using BioCuckoo, TMEM19 was analyzed for phosphorylation sites in the protein sequence. The program was run on a medium threshold and scanned for every kinase available. Phosphorylation sites are in order of decreasing score. AGC represents protein kinase A, protein kinase G, and protein kinase C.

Phosphorylation Sites
Position	Code	Kinase	Protein Sequence Pos.	Score	Cutoff
197	S	AGC	SEVGPVLSKSSPRLI	0.0559	0.0197
214	T	AGC	WEKVPVGTNGGVTVV	0.0568	0.0197
187	T	CK1	LACSAGDTWASEVGP	0.0666	0.0532
108	S	AGC	LMFFLSSSKLTKWKG	0.1333	0.0197
288	T	CK1	YTGLDESTGMVVNSP	0.1427	0.0532
287	S	CK1	QYTGLDESTGMVVNS	0.1517	0.0532
200	S	CDK, MAPK, GSK, CLK	GPVLSKSSPRLITTW	0.1546	0.0403
296	T	CK1	GMVVNSPTNKARHIA	0.2926	0.0532
125	Y	TK	KKRLDSEYKEGGQRN	0.7851	0.7641
167	Y	TK	PVDFSKQYSASWMCL	0.8679	0.7641
281	Y	TK	YLGATMQYTGLDEST	0.9762	0.7641

== Evolutionary history ==
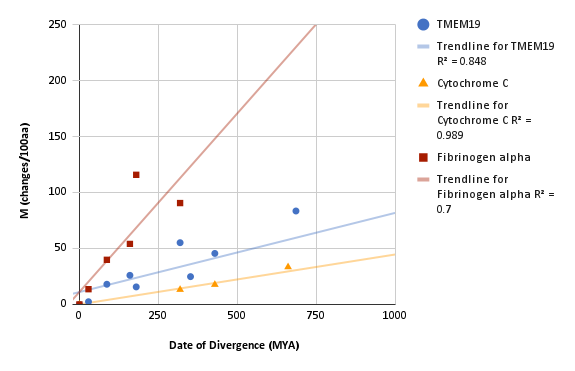
Sequence Divergence of TMEM19. The sequence divergence of TMEM19 was compared alongside Cytochrome C and Fibrinogen alpha. Sequence identity of each protein was determined in order to find the sequence divergence. The sequence divergence was used to calculate the corrected divergence (M). A line of best fit was included to show the projected divergence.

TMEM19 Orthologs were sorted by the median date of divergence. TMEM19 has a median date of divergence greater than 1598 MYA which is found in Thale cress. TMEM19 does not have any paralogs, this was determined after running TMEM19 through BLAST. The human TMEM19 protein is closely related to vertebrates and moderately related to fungi/plants. TMEM19 evolves at a rate that is related to cytochrome c.

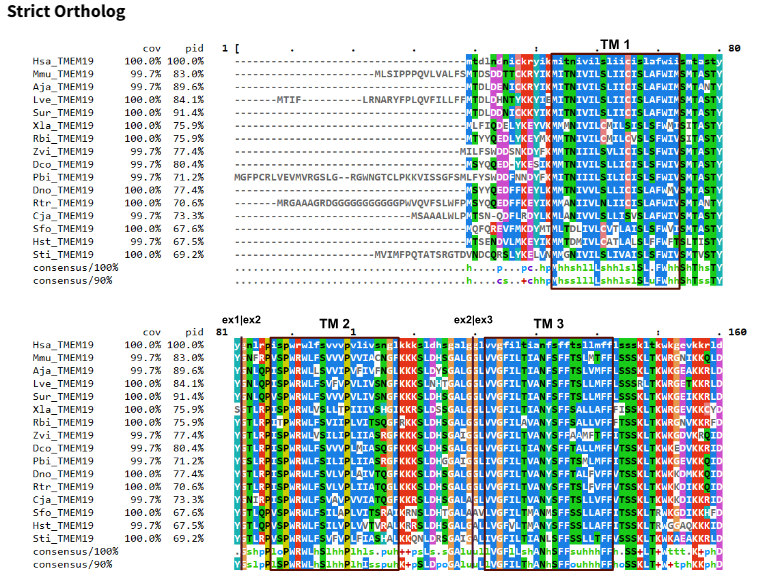
TMEM19 Strict Orthologs (Vertebrates) Multiple Sequence Alignment. Sequences were aligned using ClustalO, transmembrane regions and exons were boxed. Consensus of amino acids are shown at 100% and 90%. Amino acids are colored based on their physicochemical properties.

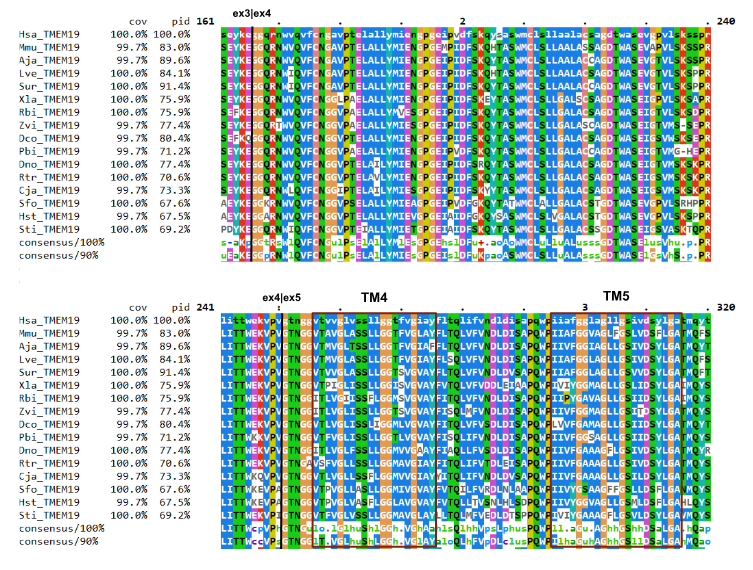
TMEM19 Strict Orthologs (Vertebrates) Multiple Sequence Alignment. Sequences were aligned using ClustalO, transmembrane regions and exons were boxed. Consensus of amino acids are shown at 100% and 90%. Amino acids are colored based on their physicochemical properties.

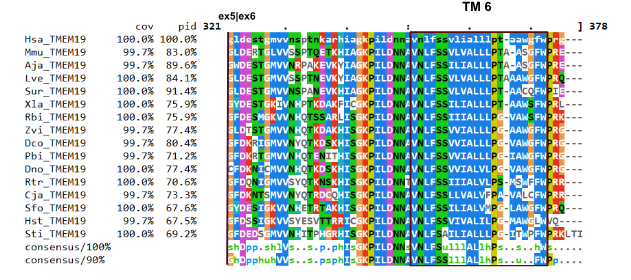
TMEM19 Strict Orthologs (Vertebrates) Multiple Sequence Alignment. Sequences were aligned using ClustalO, transmembrane regions and exons were boxed. Consensus of amino acids are shown at 100% and 90%. Amino acids are colored based on their physicochemical properties.

Orthologs of Human TMEM19
Common name	Class	Order	Genus and species	Median Date of Divergence	Accession number	Sequence length	Sequence identity to Humans %	Sequence similarity to Humans %
Humans	Mammal	Primates	Homo sapiens	0	NP_060749.2	336	100	100
Mouse	Mammal	Rodentia	Mus musculus	87	NP_001346399.1	351	87.46	90.3
Meerkat	Mammal	Carnivora	Suricata suricatta	94	XP_029810978.1	336	91.92	96.4
Jamaican Fruit Bat	Mammal	Bats	Artibeus jamaicensis	94	XP_037017069.2	336	90.45	95.5
Baiji Dolphin	Mammal	Artiodactyla	Lipotes vexillifer	94	XP_007448836.1	358	89.58	90.8
Leatherback Turtle	Reptile	Testudines	Dermochelys coriacea	319	XP_038233118.1	335	82.26	89.9
Schlegal's Japanese Gecko	Reptile	Squamata	Gekko japonicus	319	XP_015261175.1	282	81.23	77.4
Burmese Python	Reptile	Squamata	Python bivittatus	319	XP_007423004.1	371	80.06	80.1
Viviparous Lizard	Reptile	Squamata	Zootoca vivipara	319	XP_034984278.1	336	79.85	88.3
Emu	Bird	Casuariiformes	Dromaius novaehollandiae	319	XP_025956153.1	336	77.38	89.3
Black Legged Kittiwake	Bird	Charadriiformes	Rissa tridactyla	319	XP_054044439.1	367	77.31	82.3
Japanese Quail	Bird	Galliformes	Coturnix japonica	319	XP_015711317.1	344	76.13	86.4
California Condor	Bird	Gymnogyps	Accipitriformes	319	XP_050753817.1	336	77.4	89.6
African Clawed Frog	Amphibian	Anura	Xenopus laevis	352	NP_001085034.1	336	76.12	89.3
Two-Lined Caecillian	Amphibian	Gymnophiona	Rhinatrema bivittatum	352	XP_029453037.1	336	76.12	89.3
Asian Arowana	Fish	Osteoglossiformes	Scleropages formosus	429	XP_018611167.1	336	69.33	84.5
Pacific Halibut	Fish	Pleuronectiformes	Hippoglossus stenolepis	429	XP_035003305.1	335	67.87	83
Sea Lamprey	Fish	Petromyzontiformes	Petromyzon marinus	563	XP_032815808.1	362	63.35	73
Zebra Shark	Fish	Orectolobiformes	Stegostoma tigrinum	462	XP_048404699.1	354	73.59	80.5
Pin Mould	Fungi	Mucorales	Mucor mucedo	1275	XP_051459555.1	284	32.8	47.7
Ascomycete Fungi	Fungi	Helotiales	Lachnellula hyalina	1275	XP_031007997.1	383	23.3	35.9
Thale Cress	Plant	Brassicales	Arabidopsis thaliana	1598	NP_001190343.1	288	34.6	50
