= CEP68 =

Protein-coding gene in humans

Identifiers
- Aliases: CEP68, KIAA0582, centrosomal protein 68
- External IDs: OMIM: 616889; MGI: 2667663; GeneCards: CEP68

Gene location (Human)
Chr.	Chromosome 2 (human)
Band	2p14	Start	65,056,366 bp
Band	2p14	End	65,087,004 bp

Gene location (Mouse)
Chr.	Chromosome 11 (mouse)
Band	11 A3.1|11 12.92 cM	Start	20,177,037 bp
Band	11 A3.1|11 12.92 cM	End	20,199,429 bp
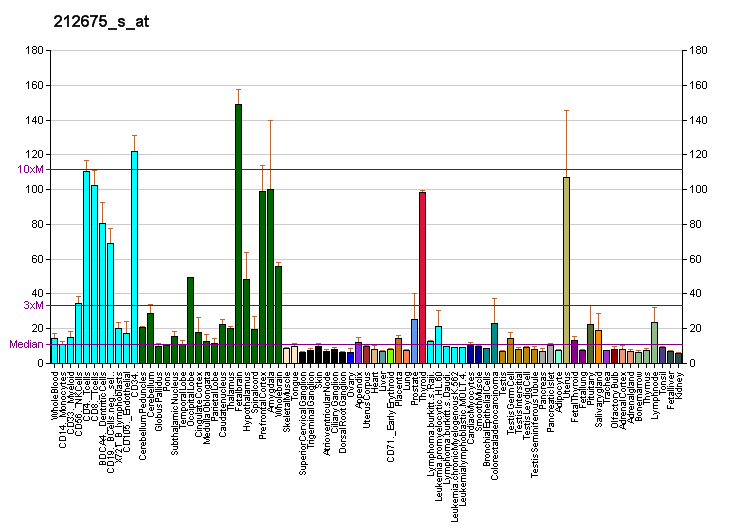

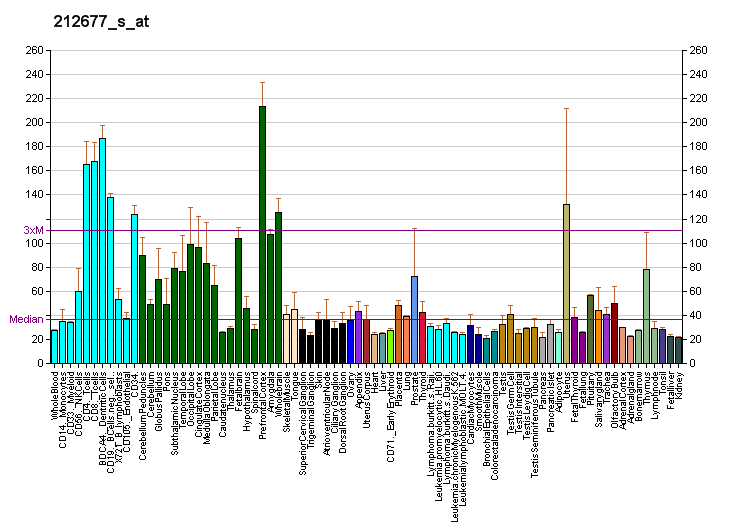

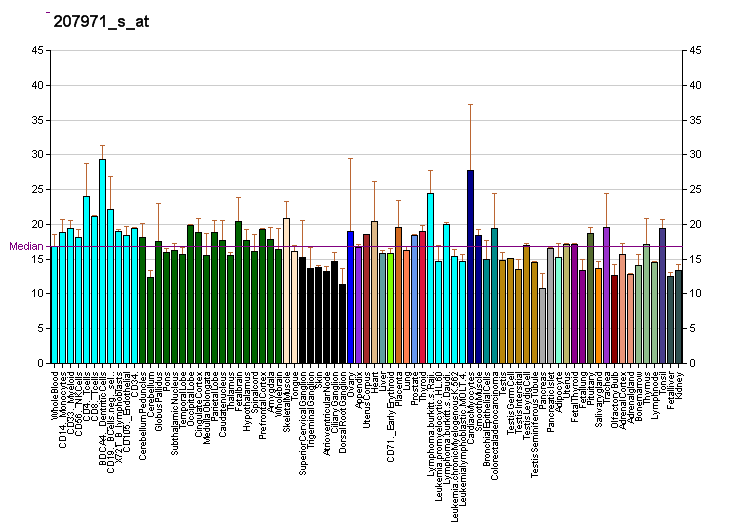
RNA expression pattern
Bgee	Human / Mouse (ortholog); Top expressed in: biceps brachii; Skeletal muscle tissue of biceps brachii; glutes; Skeletal muscle tissue of rectus abdominis; skin of hip; skin of thigh; superficial temporal artery; parietal pleura; urethra; nipple / Top expressed in: Rostral migratory stream; digastric muscle; extraocular muscle; sternocleidomastoid muscle; triceps brachii muscle; soleus muscle; temporal muscle; abdominal wall; vastus lateralis muscle; myocardium of ventricle; More reference expression data
BioGPS	More reference expression data
Gene ontology
Molecular function	protein domain specific binding; protein kinase binding; protein binding
Cellular component	cell junction; nucleus; centrosome; microtubule organizing center; cytoskeleton; cytoplasm; cytosol
Biological process	protein localization to organelle; centriole-centriole cohesion; centrosome cycle
Sources:Amigo / QuickGO
Orthologs
Databases	NCBI: entry; OMA: entry
Species	Human	Mouse
Entrez	23177	216543
Ensembl	ENSG00000011523	ENSMUSG00000044066
UniProt	Q76N32	Q8C0D9
RefSeq (mRNA)	NM_015147; NM_001319100; NM_001319101	NM_172260
RefSeq (protein)	NP_001306029; NP_001306030; NP_055962	NP_758464
Location (UCSC)	Chr 2: 65.06 – 65.09 Mb	Chr 11: 20.18 – 20.2 Mb
PubMed search
- Wikidata
View/Edit Human	View/Edit Mouse

Centrosomal protein of 68 kDa is a protein that in humans is encoded by the CEP68 gene. CEP68 is required for centrosome cohesion. It decorates fibres emanating from the proximal ends of centrioles. During mitosis, CEP68 dissociates from centrosomes. CEP68 and rootletin depend on each other for centriole association, and both also require CEP250 for their function.
