= TRMD =

TRMD may refer to:

- TRMD, stock ticker for Dampskibsselskabet Torm, a shipping company
- TrmD, TRNA (guanine37-N1)-methyltransferase, an enzyme
