= TYW1 =

Protein-coding gene in humans

Identifiers
- Aliases: TYW1, RSAFD1, TYW1A, YPL207W, tRNA-yW synthesizing protein 1 homolog
- External IDs: OMIM: 611243; MGI: 2141161; GeneCards: TYW1
Enzyme activity
EC #	BRENDA	ExPASy	KEGG	MetaCyc
4.1.3.44	↗	↗	↗	↗

Gene location (Human)
Chr.	Chromosome 7 (human)
Band	7q11.21	Start	66,995,173 bp
Band	7q11.21	End	67,239,514 bp

Gene location (Mouse)
Chr.	Chromosome 5 (mouse)
Band	5|5 G1.3	Start	130,284,460 bp
Band	5|5 G1.3	End	130,370,404 bp
RNA expression pattern
Bgee	Human / Mouse (ortholog); Top expressed in: sural nerve; gonad; bone marrow cell; testicle; ectocervix; left ovary; gastrocnemius muscle; canal of the cervix; skeletal muscle tissue; right ovary / Top expressed in: otic vesicle; saccule; primary oocyte; otic placode; secondary oocyte; spermatocyte; zygote; epiblast; spermatid; right kidney; More reference expression data
BioGPS	n/a
Orthologs
Databases	NCBI: entry; OMA: entry
Species	Human	Mouse
Entrez	55253	100929
Ensembl	ENSG00000198874	ENSMUSG00000056310
UniProt	Q9NV66	Q8BJM7
RefSeq (mRNA)	NM_018264	NM_001015876; NM_178897
RefSeq (protein)	NP_060734	NP_001015876; NP_849228
Location (UCSC)	Chr 7: 67 – 67.24 Mb	Chr 5: 130.28 – 130.37 Mb
PubMed search
- Wikidata
View/Edit Human	View/Edit Mouse

TRNA-YW synthesizing protein 1 homolog is a protein that in humans is encoded by the TYW1 gene. TYW1 is an S-adenosyl-L-methionine-dependent enzyme involved in wybutosine biosynthesis on phenylalanine tRNA. It is associated with tRNA processing and RNA metabolism.
