= TRNA wybutosine-synthesizing protein 3 =

Enzyme

tRNA wybutosine-synthesizing protein 3
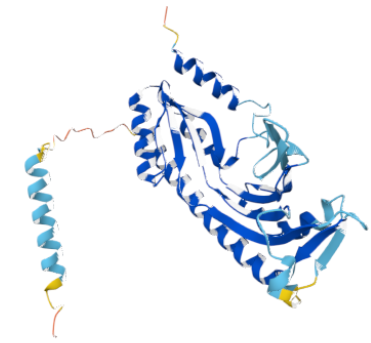
- The enzyme as folded by AlphaFold

Identifiers
- EC no.: 2.1.1.282

Databases
- BRENDA: enzyme data
- ExPASy: NiceZyme view
- KEGG: enzyme entry
- MetaCyc: metabolic pathway
- Rhea: reactions
- PDB structures: RCSB PDB PDBe PDBsum
Search
- PMC: articles
- PubMed: articles
- NCBI: proteins

TYW3

Identifiers
- Aliases: TYW3, C1orf171, tRNA-yW synthesizing protein 3 homolog
- External IDs: OMIM: 611245; MGI: 2445040; GeneCards: TYW3
Enzyme activity
EC #	BRENDA	ExPASy	KEGG	MetaCyc
2.1.1.282	↗	↗	↗	↗

Gene location (Human)
Chr.	Chromosome 1 (human)
Band	1p31.1	Start	74,733,152 bp
Band	1p31.1	End	74,766,678 bp

Gene location (Mouse)
Chr.	Chromosome 3 (mouse)
Band	3|3 H4	Start	154,282,068 bp
Band	3|3 H4	End	154,302,741 bp
RNA expression pattern
Bgee	Human / Mouse (ortholog); Top expressed in: pancreatic epithelial cell; myocardium of left ventricle; Achilles tendon; tendon of biceps brachii; sperm; gonad; tibialis anterior muscle; cardiac muscle tissue of right atrium; islet of Langerhans; secondary oocyte / Top expressed in: morula; proximal tubule; right kidney; hand; tail of embryo; embryo; embryo; human kidney; genital tubercle; trigeminal ganglion; More reference expression data
BioGPS	n/a
Gene ontology
Molecular function	methyltransferase activity; transferase activity; tRNA methyltransferase activity
Cellular component	cytoplasm
Biological process	methylation; tRNA processing; tRNA methylation; wybutosine biosynthetic process
Sources:Amigo / QuickGO
Orthologs
Databases	NCBI: entry; OMA: entry
Species	Human	Mouse
Entrez	127253	209584
Ensembl	ENSG00000162623	ENSMUSG00000047583
UniProt	Q6IPR3	Q8BSA9
RefSeq (mRNA)	NM_001162916; NM_138467	NM_001168358; NM_172474
RefSeq (protein)	NP_001156388; NP_612476	NP_001161830; NP_766062
Location (UCSC)	Chr 1: 74.73 – 74.77 Mb	Chr 3: 154.28 – 154.3 Mb
PubMed search
- Wikidata
View/Edit Human	View/Edit Mouse

tRNA wybutosine-synthesizing protein 3, known also as tRNA^{Phe} 7-[(3-amino-3-carboxypropyl)-4-demethylwyosine^{37}-N^{4}]-methyltransferase, abbreviated to TYW3 is an S-adenosyl-L-methionine-dependent methyltransferase that is involved in the biosynthetic pathway of wybutosine, a hyper-modified guanosine possessing tricyclic base found at the 3'-position which is close to the anticodon of eukaryotic phenylalanine tRNA. TYW3 is believed to also methylate the carboxyl group of leucine to form α-leucine esters. The enzyme catalyzes the following reaction,

4-demethyl-7-[(3S)-3-amino-3-carboxypropyl]wyosine(37) + S-adenosyl-L-methionine = 7-[(3S)-3-amino-3-carboxypropyl]wyosine(37) + S-adenosyl-L-homocysteine + H^{+}

The modifications this enzyme makes are important for translational reading-frame maintenance. TYW3 is found in all eukaryotes and in some archaea, but not in bacteria.
