= TYW5 =

Identifiers
- Aliases: TYW5, C2orf60, htRNA-yW synthesizing protein 5
- External IDs: MGI: 1915986; GeneCards: TYW5
Available structures
PDB	Ortholog search: PDBe RCSB
PDB	List of PDB id codes 3AL5, 3AL6
Enzyme activity
EC #	BRENDA	ExPASy	KEGG	MetaCyc
1.14.11.42	↗	↗	↗	↗

Gene location (Human)
Chr.	Chromosome 2 (human)
Band	2q33.1	Start	199,928,913 bp
Band	2q33.1	End	199,955,736 bp

Gene location (Mouse)
Chr.	Chromosome 1 (mouse)
Band	1|1 C1.3	Start	57,427,396 bp
Band	1|1 C1.3	End	57,446,260 bp
RNA expression pattern
Bgee	Human / Mouse (ortholog); Top expressed in: pancreatic epithelial cell; mucosa of ileum; tendon of biceps brachii; testicle; tibialis anterior muscle; internal globus pallidus; bone marrow; endothelial cell; right adrenal cortex; left adrenal gland / Top expressed in: spermatocyte; aortic valve; ascending aorta; embryo; embryo; tail of embryo; epiblast; zygote; primitive streak; left lobe of liver; More reference expression data
BioGPS	n/a
Gene ontology
Molecular function	2-oxoglutarate-dependent dioxygenase activity; iron ion binding; tRNA binding; oxidoreductase activity; protein homodimerization activity; dioxygenase activity; metal ion binding; tRNAPhe (7-(3-amino-3-carboxypropyl)wyosine37-C2)-hydroxylase activity
Cellular component	cytoplasm
Biological process	tRNA modification; wybutosine biosynthetic process; tRNA processing
Sources:Amigo / QuickGO
Orthologs
Databases	NCBI: entry; OMA: entry
Species	Human	Mouse
Entrez	129450	68736
Ensembl	ENSG00000162971	ENSMUSG00000048495
UniProt	A2RUC4	A2RSX7
RefSeq (mRNA)	NM_001039693; NM_152382	NM_001037742; NM_001114102; NM_001302962; NM_001302963; NM_001302964
RefSeq (protein)	NP_001034782	NP_001032831; NP_001289891; NP_001289892; NP_001289893
Location (UCSC)	Chr 2: 199.93 – 199.96 Mb	Chr 1: 57.43 – 57.45 Mb
PubMed search
- Wikidata
View/Edit Human	View/Edit Mouse

TRNA-YW Synthesizing Protein 5 (TYW5) is a human protein that is encoded by the TYW5 gene.

== Gene ==
TYW5 is located on chromosome 2q33.1 on the minus strand and spans 26,579 nucleotides.

=== Gene neighborhood ===
TYW5 is neighbored upstream by the genes C2orf69 (199,911,293 - 199,955,935) and Matrix AAA Peptidase Interacting Protein 1 (MAIP1) (199,955,317-200,008,540).

== Protein ==
The TYW5 protein consists of 315 amino acids with a molecular mass of approximately 36.5 kDa. TYW5 functions as a homodimer and relies on Fe²⁺ ions as cofactors for its enzymatic activity, specifically involved in tRNA modification.

== Evolution ==
=== Paralogs ===
There are four known paralogs to TYW5.

- HSPB1 Associated Protein 1 (HSPBAP1)
- Jumonji C Domain-Containing Protein 5 (JMJD5)
- Hypoxia Inducible Factor 1 Subunit Alpha Inhibitor (HIF1AN)
- Jumonji Domain-Containing Protein 7 (JMJD7)

=== Orthologs ===
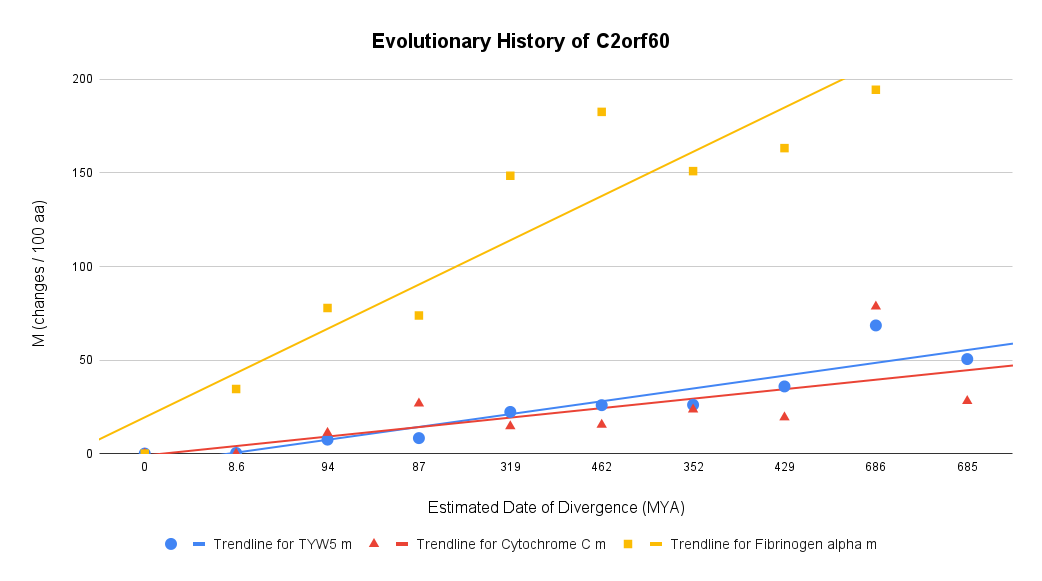
Corrected Sequence Divergence vs Estimated Date of Divergence of TYW5.

TYW5 in Homo sapiens is shown to be highly conserved. It is found in many vertebrates and invertebrates, as displayed in the table 1.

Table 1: Selected Orthologs of TYW5 (C2orf60)
Genus/Species	Common Name	Class	Order	Accession Number	Sequence Length (aa)	Sequence Identity (%)	Divergence from Humans (MYA)
Homo sapiens	Human	Mammalia	Primate	NP_001034782.1	315	100%	-
Gorilla gorilla gorilla	Gorilla	Mammalia	Primate	XP_018878290.1	315	99.68%	8.6
Artibeus jamaicensis	Jamaican fruit bat	Mammalia	Chiroptera	XP_037023423.2	315	94.92%	94
Hippopotamus amphibius kiboko	River Hippopotamus	Mammalia	Artiodactyla	XP_057601540.1	315	94.57%	94
Talpa occidentalis	Spanish mole	Mammalia	Eulipotyphla	XP_037379687.1	315	94.29%	94
Panthera tigris	Tiger	Mammalia	Carnivora	XP_007094793.1	315	93.65%	94
Ictidomys tridecemlineatus	Thirteen-lined ground squirrel	Mammalia	Rodentia	XP_005340922.1	315	92.06%	87
Eschrichtius robustus	Gray whale	Mammalia	Artiodactyla	XP_068400800.1	315	86.84%	94
Alligator mississippiensis	American alligator	Reptilia	Crocodilia	KYO33633.1	315	81.90%	319
Caretta caretta	Loggerhead sea turtle	Reptilia	Testudines	XP_048726478.1	315	81.27%	319
Gavia stellata	Red-throated loon	Aves	Gaviiformes	XP_059676631.1	318	79.55%	319
Gallus gallus	Red junglefowl	Aves	Galliformes	E1C7T6.1	318	77.52%	319
Pristis pectinata	Smalltooth sawfish	Chondrichthyes	Rhinopristiformes	XP_051883094.1	316	77.20%	462
Microcaecilia unicolor	Tiny Cayenne Caecilian	Amphibia	Gymnophiona	XP_030065847.1	354	77.07%	352
Acipenser oxyrinchus oxyrinchus	Atlantic sturgeon	Actinopterygii	Acipenseriformes	KAK1165839.1	341	72.82%	429
Danio rerio	Zebrafish	Actinopterygii	Cypriniformes	NP_001071011.1	326	66.99%	429
Haliotis asinina	Ass's-Ear Abalone	Gastropoda	Lepetellida	XP_067686775.1	326	65.91%	686
Owenia fusiformis	Tubeworm	Polychaeta	Canalipalpata	CAH1788010.1	370	65.33%	686
Exaiptasia diaphana	Pale anemone	Hexacorallia	Actiniaria	XP_020892862.1	308	60.34%	685
Anabrus simplex	Mormon cricket	Insecta	Orthoptera	P_066991715.2	313	59.40%	686
Ornithodoros turicata	relapsing fever tick	Arachnida	Ixodida	XP_064459258.1	309	54.18%	686
Drosophila melanogaster	Common fruit fly	Insecta	Diptera	7YXJ_A	322	23.49%	686
