= Ninein =

Protein in humans and other animals

NIN

Identifiers
- Aliases: NIN, SCKL7, ninein
- External IDs: OMIM: 608684; MGI: 105108; GeneCards: NIN

Gene location (Human)
Chr.	Chromosome 14 (human)
Band	14q22.1	Start	50,719,763 bp
Band	14q22.1	End	50,831,162 bp

Gene location (Mouse)
Chr.	Chromosome 12 (mouse)
Band	12|12 C2	Start	70,058,209 bp
Band	12|12 C2	End	70,160,491 bp
RNA expression pattern
Bgee	Human / Mouse (ortholog); Top expressed in: buccal mucosa cell; cardiac muscle tissue of right atrium; tendon of biceps brachii; bone marrow cell; blood; sural nerve; monocyte; trabecular bone; skin of hip; internal globus pallidus / Top expressed in: secondary oocyte; primary oocyte; granulocyte; zygote; tail of embryo; decidua; gastrula; olfactory epithelium; morula; morula; More reference expression data
BioGPS	n/a
Gene ontology
Molecular function	nucleotide binding; calcium ion binding; GTP binding; protein binding; kinase binding
Cellular component	cytoplasm; microtubule organizing center; spindle pole; nucleolus; pericentriolar material; microtubule; cytoskeleton; mitotic spindle pole; microtubule minus-end; centrosome; ciliary transition fiber; nucleus; centriole; mitotic spindle; centriolar subdistal appendage; plasma membrane; axon; dendrite; axonal growth cone; apical part of cell
Biological process	centrosome localization; centrosome-templated microtubule nucleation; microtubule anchoring at centrosome; protein localization; centriole-centriole cohesion; corpus callosum morphogenesis; corticospinal tract morphogenesis; positive regulation of microtubule polymerization; collateral sprouting; positive regulation of axonogenesis
Sources:Amigo / QuickGO
Orthologs
Databases	NCBI: entry; OMA: entry
Species	Human	Mouse
Entrez	51199	18080
Ensembl	ENSG00000100503	ENSMUSG00000021068
UniProt	Q8N4C6	Q61043
RefSeq (mRNA)	NM_016350; NM_020921; NM_182944; NM_182945; NM_182946	NM_001081453; NM_001286079; NM_001286080; NM_008697
RefSeq (protein)	NP_057434; NP_065972; NP_891989; NP_891991	NP_001074922; NP_001273008; NP_001273009; NP_032723; NP_001390761
Location (UCSC)	Chr 14: 50.72 – 50.83 Mb	Chr 12: 70.06 – 70.16 Mb
PubMed search
- Wikidata
View/Edit Human	View/Edit Mouse

Ninein is a protein that in humans is encoded by the NIN gene.

== Function ==
Ninein, together with its paralog Ninein-like protein is one of the proteins important for centrosomal function. Localization of this protein to the centrosome requires three leucine zippers in the central coiled-coil domain. Multiple alternatively spliced transcript variants that encode different isoforms have been reported.

This protein is important for positioning and anchoring the microtubules minus-ends in epithelial cells.
