= C19orf44 =

Mammalian protein found in Homo sapiens

Identifiers
- Aliases: C19orf44, chromosome 19 open reading frame 44, Chromosome 19 open reading frame 44
- External IDs: MGI: 1919504; HomoloGene: 12975; GeneCards: C19orf44; OMA:C19orf44 - orthologs

Gene location (Human)
Chr.	Chromosome 19 (human)
Band	19p13.11	Start	16,496,394 bp
Band	19p13.11	End	16,521,352 bp

Gene location (Mouse)
Chr.	Chromosome 8 (mouse)
Band	8|8 B3.3	Start	73,197,724 bp
Band	8|8 B3.3	End	73,214,845 bp
RNA expression pattern
Bgee	Human / Mouse (ortholog); Top expressed in: sperm; right uterine tube; right testis; left testis; testicle; ventricular zone; gonad; anterior pituitary; right ovary; left ovary / Top expressed in: seminiferous tubule; spermatocyte; spermatid; primary oocyte; internal carotid artery; external carotid artery; Rostral migratory stream; gastrula; secondary oocyte; neural layer of retina; More reference expression data
BioGPS	n/a
Orthologs
Species	Human	Mouse
Entrez	84167	72254
Ensembl	ENSG00000105072	ENSMUSG00000052794
UniProt	Q9H6X5	Q922C1
RefSeq (mRNA)	NM_001288834; NM_032207	NM_028170
RefSeq (protein)	NP_001275763; NP_115583	NP_082446
Location (UCSC)	Chr 19: 16.5 – 16.52 Mb	Chr 8: 73.2 – 73.21 Mb
PubMed search
- Wikidata
View/Edit Human	View/Edit Mouse

Chromosome 19 open reading frame 44 is a protein that in humans is encoded by the C19orf44 gene. C19orf44 is an uncharacterized protein with an unknown function in humans. C19orf44 is non-limiting implying that the protein (and gene) exists in other species besides human. The protein contains one domain of unknown function (DUF) that is highly conserved throughout its orthologs. This protein is most highly expressed in the testis and ovary, but also has significant expression in the thyroid and parathyroid. Other names for this protein include: LOC84167.

== Gene ==
The entire gene is 25,416 base pairs in length, and has an unprocessed mRNA that is 3,446 nucleotides in length. It contains 10 exons that code for a 657 amino acid protein. There are 7 splice variants that exist for C19orf44.

=== Locus ===
C19orf44 is located on the nineteenth chromosome on 19p13.11.

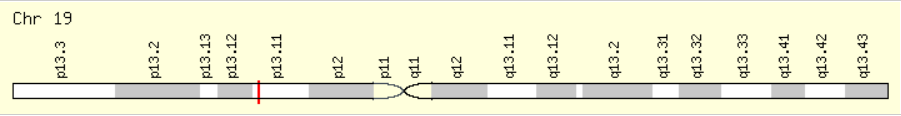
Position of C19orf44 on chromosome 19. Image taken from GeneCards.

== Protein ==
=== Primary sequence ===
C19orf44 has a molecular weight of 71,343 Da, and an isoelectric point of 5.52. The amino acid sequence for C19orf44 was found to be serine rich using tools on EMBL-EBI. Additionally, there is a domain of unknown function (DUF) located from amino acid 474 to 641.

=== Post-translational modifications ===
C19orf44 has experimentally determined phosphorylation sites at the S114 and S213 positions. Other predicted post-translational modifications were found using tools on ExPASy and are shown in the protein illustration below. N-terminal acetylation is predicted at S3. There is also a predicted sumoylation motif from amino acid 212 to 221.

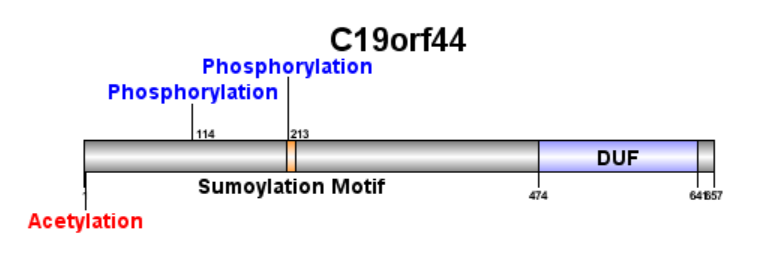
Cartoon image illustrating the C19orf44 protein and its predicted features. Image created using the DOG software from The CUCKOO WorkGroup.

=== Localization ===
C19orf44 is predicted to be localized in the nucleus or cytosol.

== Expression ==
C19orf44 is shown to be expressed at low levels in various tissues throughout the body as shown by NCBI's EST Profile. It most highly expressed in the testis and ovary, but also has significant expression in the thyroid and parathyroid. C19orf44 is expressed in all stages of development, except for in infants. There is an increased expression of C19orf44 in a developing fetus.

== Homology and evolution ==
=== Orthologs ===
Orthologs of C19orf44 have been found in most mammals and a select few other vertebrates and invertebrates. Multiple sequence alignments using ClustalW provided evidence that the DUF in C19orf44 is highly conserved in its orthologs. The table below represents a small selection of the orthologs found using NCBI Blast.

C19orf44 Significant Orthologs
Genus and Species	Common name	Accession number (from NCBI)	Divergence (MYA)	Sequence Identity (%)
Rhinopithecus roxellana	Golden Snub-nosed Monkey	XP_010359783.1	29	86.9
Orcinus orca	Killer Whale	XP_004277754.1	96	83.2
Sus scrofa	Wild Boar	XP_005661251.2	96	60.1
Monodelphis domestica	Opossum	XP_007489796.1	159	45.5
Chelonia mydas	Green Sea Turtle	XP_007072179.1	312	35.2
Astyanax mexicanus	Mexican Tetra	XP_007246256.2	435	28.2
Mizuhopecten yessoensis	Scallop	XP_021343742.1	797	24.4

=== Paralogs ===
There are no paralogs for C19orf44 in Homo sapiens.

== Interacting proteins ==
C19orf44 has been found to interact with various proteins from the two-hybrid screening method. Interactions with Hsp90 co-chaperone (CDC37), and spermatid associated protein (SPERT) have been found.
