= CEP135 =

Protein-coding gene in the species Homo sapiens

Available structures
PDB	Ortholog search: PDBe RCSB
PDB	List of PDB id codes 5FCN

Identifiers
- Aliases: CEP135, CEP4, KIAA0635, MCPH8, centrosomal protein 135
- External IDs: OMIM: 611423; MGI: 2681869; HomoloGene: 45709; GeneCards: CEP135; OMA:CEP135 - orthologs

Gene location (Human)
Chr.	Chromosome 4 (human)
Band	4q12	Start	55,948,871 bp
Band	4q12	End	56,033,361 bp

Gene location (Mouse)
Chr.	Chromosome 5 (mouse)
Band	5|5 C3.3	Start	76,736,545 bp
Band	5|5 C3.3	End	76,794,313 bp
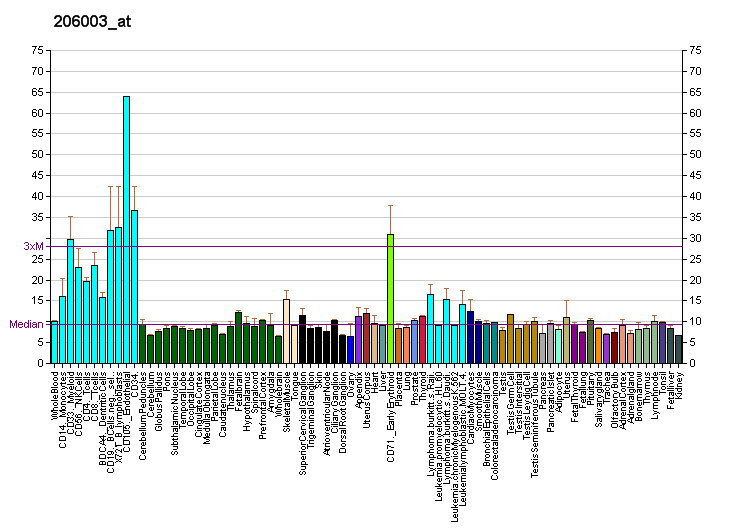
RNA expression pattern
Bgee	Human / Mouse (ortholog); Top expressed in: amniotic fluid; buccal mucosa cell; sperm; ventricular zone; testicle; gonad; bone marrow; monocyte; Achilles tendon; secondary oocyte / Top expressed in: zygote; genital tubercle; tail of embryo; secondary oocyte; spermatid; spermatocyte; granulocyte; ventricular zone; primary oocyte; epiblast; More reference expression data
BioGPS	More reference expression data
Gene ontology
Molecular function	protein C-terminus binding; protein binding
Cellular component	cytoplasm; centriole; cytosol; centrosome; cytoskeleton
Biological process	centriole replication; centriole-centriole cohesion; G2/M transition of mitotic cell cycle; positive regulation of non-motile cilium assembly; ciliary basal body-plasma membrane docking; regulation of G2/M transition of mitotic cell cycle; positive regulation of establishment of protein localization
Sources:Amigo / QuickGO
Orthologs
Species	Human	Mouse
Entrez	9662	381644
Ensembl	ENSG00000174799	ENSMUSG00000036403
UniProt	Q66GS9	Q6P5D4
RefSeq (mRNA)	NM_014645; NM_025009	NM_199032
RefSeq (protein)	NP_079285	NP_950197
Location (UCSC)	Chr 4: 55.95 – 56.03 Mb	Chr 5: 76.74 – 76.79 Mb
PubMed search
- Wikidata
View/Edit Human	View/Edit Mouse

Centrosomal protein of 135 kDa is a protein that in humans is encoded by the CEP135 gene. It is part of the centrosome throughout the cell cycle, being distributed in the pericentriolar material. CEP135 is required for the centriolar localization of CEP250.
