= CFAP100 =

Protein-coding gene found in humans

Identifiers
- Aliases: CFAP100, MIA1, CCDC37, cilia and flagella associated protein 100
- External IDs: MGI: 2141635; GeneCards: CFAP100

Gene location (Human)
Chr.	Chromosome 3 (human)
Band	3q21.3	Start	126,394,909 bp
Band	3q21.3	End	126,436,556 bp

Gene location (Mouse)
Chr.	Chromosome 6 (mouse)
Band	6|6 D1	Start	90,403,479 bp
Band	6|6 D1	End	90,428,797 bp
RNA expression pattern
Bgee	Human / Mouse (ortholog); Top expressed in: right uterine tube; right testis; left testis; bronchial epithelial cell; olfactory zone of nasal mucosa; gonad; right lung; testicle; nasal epithelium; left uterine tube / Top expressed in: spermatid; testicle; hypothalamus; spermatocyte; ovary; morula; visual cortex; hippocampus proper; primary visual cortex; mesencephalon; More reference expression data
BioGPS	n/a
Gene ontology
Molecular function	dynein complex binding
Cellular component	motile cilium; axonemal outer doublet; cytoplasm; cytoskeleton; cilium; cell projection
Biological process	inner dynein arm assembly; cilium movement
Sources:Amigo / QuickGO
Orthologs
Databases	NCBI: entry; OMA: entry
Species	Human	Mouse
Entrez	348807	243538
Ensembl	ENSG00000163885	ENSMUSG00000048794
UniProt	Q494V2	Q80VN0
RefSeq (mRNA)	NM_182628	NM_173775
RefSeq (protein)	NP_872434	NP_776136
Location (UCSC)	Chr 3: 126.39 – 126.44 Mb	Chr 6: 90.4 – 90.43 Mb
PubMed search
- Wikidata
View/Edit Human	View/Edit Mouse

Cilia- and flagella-associated protein 100 is a protein that in humans is encoded by the CFAP100 gene (previously CCDC37). The CFAP100 protein regulates various aspects of the cilia including axonemal inner dynein arm assembly and microtubule organization.

== Gene ==
=== Locus ===
The human gene CCDC37 is found on chromosome 3 at the band 3q21.3. It extends from base pairs 90,403,731 to 90,429,231, making the gene 25,500 base pairs long. It is located on the plus strand and contains 17 exons.

== Homology ==
=== Paralogs ===
There is only one paralog for CCDC37 found in humans, CCDC38. CCDC38 is located on chromosome 12.

=== Orthologs ===
The ortholog space of CCDC37 is fairly broad including mammals, reptiles, birds, amphibians, fish, invertebrates, and fungi.

Genus and species	Common name	Class	Accession	Percent identity
Pan troglodytes	Chimpanzee	Mammalia	XP_516716.3	99%
Otolemur crassicaudatus	Bushbaby	Mammalia		78%
Sus scrofa	Pig	Mammalia	XP_005666178.1	70%
Felis catus	Cat	Mammalia	XP_006929102.1	69%
Canis lupus	Dog	Mammalia	XP_005632343.1	68%
Mus musculus	Mouse	Mammalia	NP_776136.2	67%
Orcinus orca	Killer whale	Mammalia	XP_004285517.1	67%
Anolis carolinensis	Carolina anole	Reptilia	XP_003217822.1	54%
Python bivittatus	Burmese python	Reptilia	XP_007437868.1	53%
Chrysemys picta bellii	Painted turtle	Reptilia	XP_005288479	52%
Pseudopodoces humilis	Ground tit	Aves	XP_005522312.1	46%
Gallus gallus	Chicken	Aves	XP_425162.4	46%
Xenopus (Silurana) tropicalis	Western clawed frog	Amphibia	XP_002938271.2	43%
Astyanax mexicanus	Blind cave fish	Actinopterygii	XP_007253378.1	43%
Saccoglossus kowalevskii	Acorn worm	Enteropneusta	XP_002742365.1	43%
Ciona intestinalis	Vase tunicate	Ascidiacea	XP_002131495.1	43%
Aplysia californica	California sea slug	Gastropoda	XP_005108122.1	41%
Crassostrea gigas	Pacific oyster	Bivalvia	gbEKC37281.1	37%
Batrachochytrium dendrobatidis	Amphibian chytrid fungus	Chytridiomycetes	XP_006680088.1	37%

== Protein ==
=== Primary sequence ===
The gene encodes a protein called CCDC37. This protein in 611 amino acids in length and has a molecular weight of 71.1 kilodaltons and an isoelectric point of pI=6.7.

=== Domains ===
CCDC37 contains a DUF4200 region located from amino acid 151 to 269. There is no known function for DUF4200. CCDC37 also contains three coiled coil domains at amino acids 164–203, 392–436, and 526–571.

=== Post-translational modifications ===
The protein has several probable post-translational modifications. It contains four possible PEST sequence at amino acids 17–36, 293–304, 337–360, and 360–395. It also contains a possible substrate of N-acetyltransferase A at Ser_{2}.

=== Signal peptides ===
CCDC37 has a predicted nuclear localization via Reinhard's method (reliability 94.1%) using a bipartite nuclear localization signal peptide starting at amino acid 155: KRQMFLLQYALDVKRRE. CCDC37 also has a few predicted nuclear export signals I232, L235, I239, and M551.

== Expression ==
CCDC37 protein is widely expressed in mus musculus but only minimally so. Most areas that express CCDC37 have an expression level of 20-40%. Expression levels in the trigeminal nerve, testis, medial olfactory epithelium, dorsal root ganglia, and trachea are the highest with almost 75% expression. CCDC37 is expressed in the cerebellum, medulla, and hippocampal formation in the brain of mus musculus.

Between 20 and 30 days after birth in mus musculus, CCDC37 expression increases from less than 50% to about 85%.

In rattus norvegicus CCDC37 is highly expressed in oligodendrocyte progenitor cells (approximately 85%) but only narrowly expressed in oligodendrocytes themselves (~40%).

== Interacting proteins ==
=== Transcription factors ===
There are many predicted transcription factor binding sites in the CCDC37 promoter. Below is a table of the best possibilities, which have high confidence values, evolutionary conservation, and/or multiple possible binding sites in the promoter.

Transcription factor	Start	End	Strand	Sequence
Activator-, mediator- and TBP-dependent core promoter element for RNA polymerase II transcription from TATA-less promoters	115	125	-	ggGAGGgatcg
Nuclear factor 1	185	205	+	tgctTGGCacgtggcgaataa
E-box binding factors	186	202	-	ttcgccaCGTGccaagc
E-box binding factors	187	203	+	cttggCACGtggcgaat
Vertebrate homologues of enhancer of split complex	187	201	-	tcgccaCGTGccaag
Vertebrate homologues of enhancer of split complex	188	202	+	ttggCACGtggcgaa
CCAAT binding factors	203	217	+	taaaCCAAtcaggat
E-box binding factors	288	304	+	tgggccaGGCGctgtcc
E-box binding factors	352	368	+	ccggcccCGCGccctcc
Activator-, mediator- and TBP-dependent core promoter element for RNA polymerase II transcription from TATA-less promoters	353	363	-	gcGCGGggccg
RNA polymerase II transcription factor II B	358	364	+	ccgCGCC
cAMP-responsive element binding proteins	416	436	-	tggctgTGACgccacaaaggc
SOX/SRY-sex/testis determining and related HMG box factors	438	462	+	cctgaAGAAtggttgccttggagac
X-box binding factors	449	469	-	ggtttacgtctccaAGGCaac
cAMP-responsive element binding proteins	452	472	-	ttgggtTTACgtctccaaggc
GLI-Kruppel family member GLI3	74	88	-	atcgCCACccacact
"Negative" glucocoticoid response elements	478	492	-	cagctccaGGAGcag
Core promoter motif ten elements	538	558	-	gaccgcgAGCGcacccaccga
GC-Box factors SP1/GC	564	580	+	agagggGGCGcgcgggg
ZF5 POZ domain zinc finger	566	580	-	ccccgCGCGccccct
E2F-myc activator/cell cycle regulator	566	582	+	aggggGCGCgcggggtc

=== Interactions ===
There have been three proteins found to interact by physical association with CCDC37 through a yeast two-hybrid screen: histone-lysine N-methyltransferase (SUV39H1), histone-lysine N-methyltransferase (SUV39H2), and lysine-specific histone demethylase 1A (KDM1A).

== Clinical significance ==
In a study of the genes expressed in lung squamous cell carcinomas it was found that the promoter region of CCDC37 was hyper methylated causing down regulation of the expression of CCDC37. In a separate study, CCDC37 was also found in spatial and temporal regions in mice that are associated with hereditary congenital facial paresis (HCFP) gene. However through knock out experiments in mice it was found that CCDC37 was unlikely to be a causative agent for the HCFP phenotype.
