= CCDC57 =

Protein-coding gene in humans

Identifiers
- Aliases: CCDC57, coiled-coil domain containing 57
- External IDs: MGI: 1918526; GeneCards: CCDC57

Gene location (Human)
Chr.	Chromosome 17 (human)
Band	17q25.3	Start	82,101,460 bp
Band	17q25.3	End	82,212,830 bp

Gene location (Mouse)
Chr.	Chromosome 11 (mouse)
Band	11|11 E2	Start	120,717,355 bp
Band	11|11 E2	End	120,823,698 bp
RNA expression pattern
Bgee	Human / Mouse (ortholog); Top expressed in: right uterine tube; anterior pituitary; olfactory zone of nasal mucosa; right lobe of thyroid gland; right hemisphere of cerebellum; sural nerve; left lobe of thyroid gland; left testis; right testis; granulocyte / Top expressed in: seminiferous tubule; morula; muscle of thigh; neural layer of retina; granulocyte; ventricular zone; superior frontal gyrus; adrenal gland; tail of embryo; primary visual cortex; More reference expression data
BioGPS	n/a
Orthologs
Databases	NCBI: entry; OMA: entry
Species	Human	Mouse
Entrez	284001	71276
Ensembl	ENSG00000176155	ENSMUSG00000048445
UniProt	Q2TAC2	Q6PHN1
RefSeq (mRNA)	NM_152675; NM_198082; NM_001316321; NM_001367828; NM_001394669 NM_001394670	NM_027745
RefSeq (protein)	NP_001303250; NP_932348; NP_001354757	NP_082021
Location (UCSC)	Chr 17: 82.1 – 82.21 Mb	Chr 11: 120.72 – 120.82 Mb
PubMed search
- Wikidata
View/Edit Human	View/Edit Mouse

Coiled-coil domain-containing protein 57 is a protein that in humans is encoded by the CCDC57 gene.

== See also ==
- Coiled-coil domain
