= CEMIP =

Protein-coding gene in the species Homo sapiens

Identifiers
- Aliases: CEMIP, CCSP1, KIAA1199, TMEM2L, HYBID, cell migration inducing hyaluronan binding protein, cell migration inducing hyaluronidase 1
- External IDs: OMIM: 608366; MGI: 2443629; GeneCards: CEMIP
Enzyme activity
EC #	BRENDA	ExPASy	KEGG	MetaCyc
3.2.1.35	↗	↗	↗	↗

Gene location (Human)
Chr.	Chromosome 15 (human)
Band	15q25.1	Start	80,779,343 bp
Band	15q25.1	End	80,951,776 bp

Gene location (Mouse)
Chr.	Chromosome 7 (mouse)
Band	7 D3|7 48.35 cM	Start	83,582,065 bp
Band	7 D3|7 48.35 cM	End	83,735,710 bp
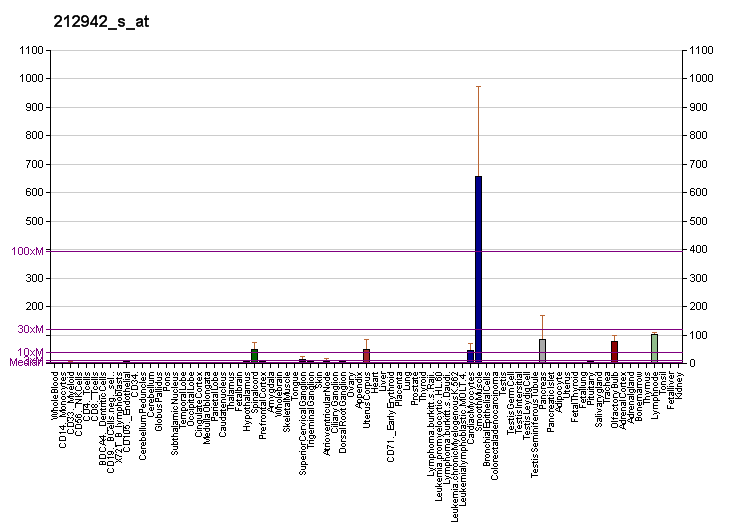
RNA expression pattern
Bgee	Human / Mouse (ortholog); Top expressed in: Epithelium of choroid plexus; trigeminal ganglion; stromal cell of endometrium; tibia; pericardium; cartilage tissue; olfactory bulb; lymph node; right lobe of thyroid gland; left lobe of thyroid gland / Top expressed in: calvaria; vestibular sensory epithelium; cranial dura mater; stroma of bone marrow; body of femur; vestibular membrane of cochlear duct; stria vascularis; trigeminal ganglion; gastrula; lumbar spinal ganglion; More reference expression data
BioGPS	More reference expression data
Gene ontology
Molecular function	clathrin heavy chain binding; ER retention sequence binding; hydrolase activity, acting on glycosyl bonds; protein binding; hyaluronic acid binding; hydrolase activity; hyalurononglucosaminidase activity
Cellular component	cytoplasm; membrane; plasma membrane; extracellular region; endoplasmic reticulum; clathrin-coated pit; nucleus; clathrin-coated vesicle membrane; clathrin-coated endocytic vesicle
Biological process	hyaluronan biosynthetic process; hyaluronan catabolic process; positive regulation of cell migration; positive regulation of protein kinase C activity; positive regulation of release of sequestered calcium ion into cytosol; hearing; positive regulation of peptidyl-threonine phosphorylation; metabolism; positive regulation of protein targeting to membrane
Sources:Amigo / QuickGO
Orthologs
Databases	NCBI: entry; OMA: entry
Species	Human	Mouse
Entrez	57214	80982
Ensembl	ENSG00000103888	ENSMUSG00000052353
UniProt	Q8WUJ3	Q8BI06
RefSeq (mRNA)	NM_018689; NM_001293298; NM_001293304	NM_030728
RefSeq (protein)	NP_001280227; NP_001280233; NP_061159	NP_109653
Location (UCSC)	Chr 15: 80.78 – 80.95 Mb	Chr 7: 83.58 – 83.74 Mb
PubMed search
- Wikidata
View/Edit Human	View/Edit Mouse

Cell migration-inducing and hyaluronan-binding protein (CEMIP), formerly known as KIAA1199, is a protein that in humans is encoded by the CEMIP gene. CEMIP has been shown to bind hyaluronic acid and catalyze its depolymerization independently of CD44 and hyaluronidases. Such function has also been validated in mice.

CEMIP is associated with nonsyndromic deafness, as well as a variety of cancers.
