= CEP128 =

Protein-coding gene in the species Homo sapiens

Identifiers
- Aliases: CEP128, C14orf145, C14orf61, LEDP/132, centrosomal protein 128
- External IDs: MGI: 1922466; HomoloGene: 35315; GeneCards: CEP128; OMA:CEP128 - orthologs

Gene location (Human)
Chr.	Chromosome 14 (human)
Band	14q31.1	Start	80,476,983 bp
Band	14q31.1	End	80,959,517 bp

Gene location (Mouse)
Chr.	Chromosome 12 (mouse)
Band	12|12 D3	Start	90,965,266 bp
Band	12|12 D3	End	91,351,183 bp
RNA expression pattern
Bgee	Human / Mouse (ortholog); Top expressed in: bone marrow cell; thymus; testicle; gonad; sural nerve; ventricular zone; Achilles tendon; left lobe of thyroid gland; right lobe of thyroid gland; ganglionic eminence / Top expressed in: spermatid; spermatocyte; seminiferous tubule; Paneth cell; decidua; internal carotid artery; hand; gastrula; external carotid artery; interventricular septum; More reference expression data
BioGPS	n/a
Orthologs
Species	Human	Mouse
Entrez	145508	75216
Ensembl	ENSG00000100629	ENSMUSG00000061533
UniProt	Q6ZU80	Q8BI22
RefSeq (mRNA)	NM_152446	NM_181815
RefSeq (protein)	NP_689659	NP_861536
Location (UCSC)	Chr 14: 80.48 – 80.96 Mb	Chr 12: 90.97 – 91.35 Mb
PubMed search
- Wikidata
View/Edit Human	View/Edit Mouse

Centrosomal protein 128kDa is a protein that in humans is encoded by the CEP128 gene.
