= TRMT12 =

Protein-coding gene in humans

Identifiers
- Aliases: TRMT12, TRM12, TYW2, tRNA methyltransferase 12 homolog
- External IDs: OMIM: 611244; MGI: 1915510; HomoloGene: 32379; GeneCards: TRMT12; OMA:TRMT12 - orthologs

Gene location (Human)
Chr.	Chromosome 8 (human)
Band	8q24.13	Start	124,450,820 bp
Band	8q24.13	End	124,462,150 bp

Gene location (Mouse)
Chr.	Chromosome 15 (mouse)
Band	15|15 D1	Start	58,744,523 bp
Band	15|15 D1	End	58,748,976 bp
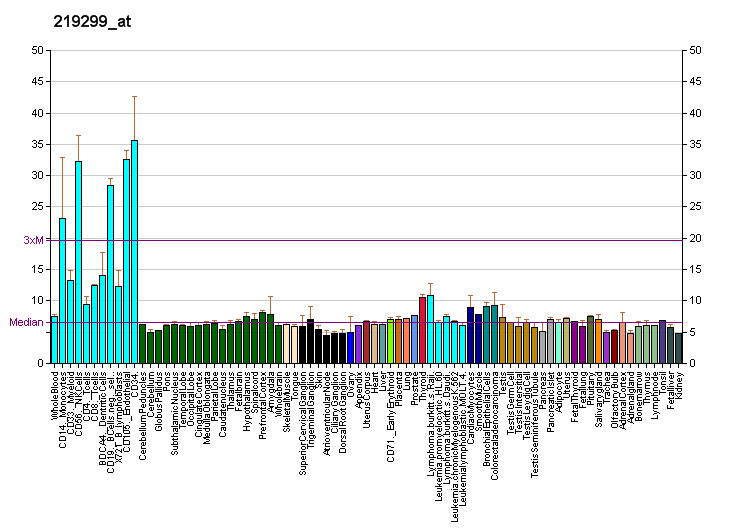
RNA expression pattern
Bgee	Human / Mouse (ortholog); Top expressed in: sperm; endothelial cell; Epithelium of choroid plexus; monocyte; islet of Langerhans; Achilles tendon; testicle; gastrocnemius muscle; secondary oocyte; amniotic fluid / Top expressed in: superior cervical ganglion; zygote; granulocyte; right kidney; tail of embryo; embryo; ventricular zone; proximal tubule; dentate gyrus of hippocampal formation granule cell; muscle of thigh; More reference expression data
BioGPS	More reference expression data
Gene ontology
Molecular function	protein binding; transferase activity; tRNA 4-demethylwyosine alpha-amino-alpha-carboxypropyltransferase activity; tRNA methyltransferase activity
Cellular component	cytoplasm
Biological process	tRNA processing; tRNA methylation; wybutosine biosynthetic process
Sources:Amigo / QuickGO
Orthologs
Species	Human	Mouse
Entrez	55039	68260
Ensembl	ENSG00000183665	ENSMUSG00000037085
UniProt	Q53H54	Q8BG71
RefSeq (mRNA)	NM_017956	NM_026642
RefSeq (protein)	NP_060426	NP_080918
Location (UCSC)	Chr 8: 124.45 – 124.46 Mb	Chr 15: 58.74 – 58.75 Mb
PubMed search
- Wikidata
View/Edit Human	View/Edit Mouse

tRNA wybutosine-synthesizing protein 2 homolog is a protein that in humans is encoded by the TRMT12 gene.
