= Ninein-like protein =

Protein found in humans

NINL

Identifiers
- Aliases: NINL, NLP, dJ691N24.1, ninein like
- External IDs: OMIM: 609580; MGI: 1925427; GeneCards: NINL

Gene location (Human)
Chr.	Chromosome 20 (human)
Band	20p11.21	Start	25,452,697 bp
Band	20p11.21	End	25,585,531 bp

Gene location (Mouse)
Chr.	Chromosome 2 (mouse)
Band	2|2 G3	Start	150,776,439 bp
Band	2|2 G3	End	150,881,302 bp
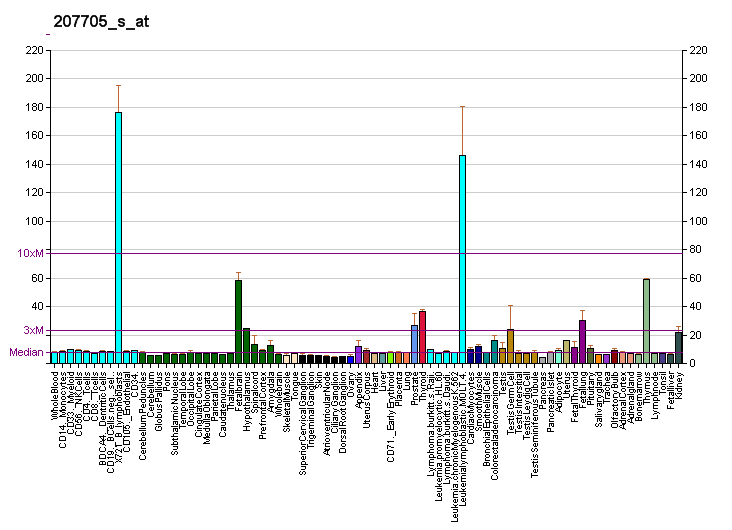
RNA expression pattern
Bgee	Human / Mouse (ortholog); Top expressed in: renal medulla; ventricular zone; cerebellar hemisphere; right hemisphere of cerebellum; left ovary; ganglionic eminence; right ovary; human kidney; right adrenal cortex; right lobe of thyroid gland / Top expressed in: otic vesicle; superior cervical ganglion; Gonadal ridge; spermatocyte; tail of embryo; ventricular zone; olfactory epithelium; spermatid; abdominal wall; hand; More reference expression data
BioGPS	More reference expression data
Gene ontology
Molecular function	calcium ion binding; protein binding; metal ion binding
Cellular component	cytoplasm; microtubule; microtubule organizing center; cytosol; intercellular bridge; cytoskeleton; centrosome
Biological process	G2/M transition of mitotic cell cycle; ciliary basal body-plasma membrane docking; regulation of G2/M transition of mitotic cell cycle; microtubule anchoring at centrosome
Sources:Amigo / QuickGO
Orthologs
Databases	NCBI: entry; OMA: entry
Species	Human	Mouse
Entrez	22981	78177
Ensembl	ENSG00000101004	ENSMUSG00000068115
UniProt	Q9Y2I6	Q6ZQ12
RefSeq (mRNA)	NM_025176; NM_001318226	NM_207204
RefSeq (protein)	NP_001305155; NP_079452	NP_997087
Location (UCSC)	Chr 20: 25.45 – 25.59 Mb	Chr 2: 150.78 – 150.88 Mb
PubMed search
- Wikidata
View/Edit Human	View/Edit Mouse

Ninein-like protein is a protein that in humans is encoded by the NINL gene. It is part of the centrosome.
