= CEP250 =

Protein-coding gene in the species Homo sapiens

Identifiers
- Aliases: CEP250, C-NAP1, CEP2, CNAP1, centrosomal protein 250, CRDHL2
- External IDs: OMIM: 609689; MGI: 108084; HomoloGene: 38286; GeneCards: CEP250; OMA:CEP250 - orthologs

Gene location (Human)
Chr.	Chromosome 20 (human)
Band	20q11.22	Start	35,455,164 bp
Band	20q11.22	End	35,519,280 bp

Gene location (Mouse)
Chr.	Chromosome 2 (mouse)
Band	2|2 H1	Start	155,798,378 bp
Band	2|2 H1	End	155,840,820 bp
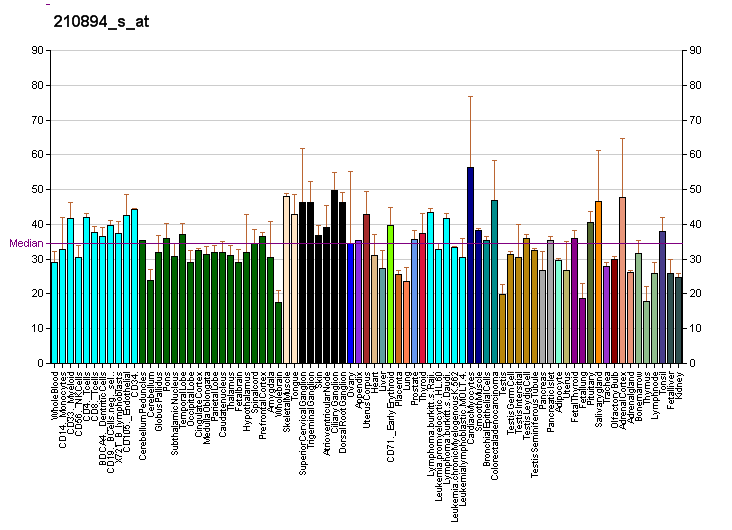

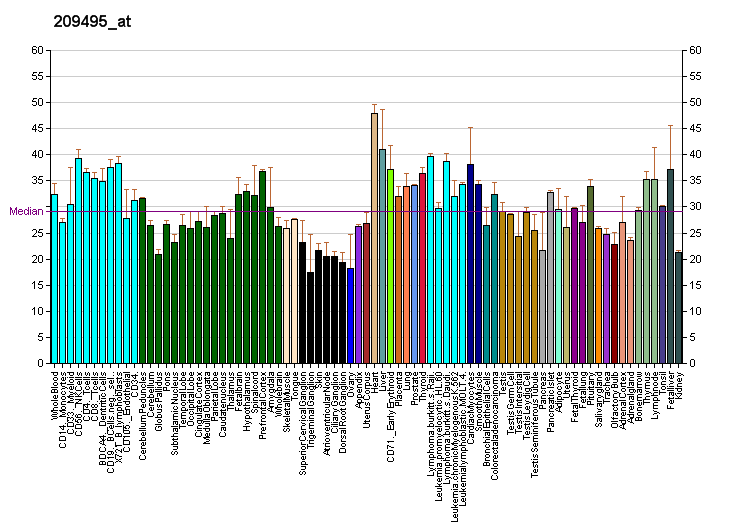
RNA expression pattern
Bgee	Human / Mouse (ortholog); Top expressed in: sural nerve; ventricular zone; granulocyte; ganglionic eminence; stromal cell of endometrium; cerebellar hemisphere; right hemisphere of cerebellum; Achilles tendon; lymph node; epithelium of colon / Top expressed in: neural layer of retina; granulocyte; tail of embryo; ventricular zone; genital tubercle; yolk sac; thymus; Jacobson's organ; zygote; secondary oocyte; More reference expression data
BioGPS	More reference expression data
Gene ontology
Molecular function	protein domain specific binding; protein C-terminus binding; protein binding; protein kinase binding
Cellular component	cytoplasm; cytosol; centrosome; cell projection; cilium; microtubule organizing center; perinuclear region of cytoplasm; centriole; extracellular exosome; cytoskeleton; protein-containing complex
Biological process	protein localization to organelle; protein localization; regulation of centriole-centriole cohesion; centriole-centriole cohesion; G2/M transition of mitotic cell cycle; cell cycle; mitotic cell cycle; ciliary basal body-plasma membrane docking; positive regulation of protein localization to centrosome; non-motile cilium assembly; regulation of G2/M transition of mitotic cell cycle
Sources:Amigo / QuickGO
Orthologs
Species	Human	Mouse
Entrez	11190	16328
Ensembl	ENSG00000126001	ENSMUSG00000038241
UniProt	Q9BV73	Q60952
RefSeq (mRNA)	NM_001035518; NM_007186; NM_001318219	NM_001129999; NM_001130000; NM_008383; NM_177217
RefSeq (protein)	NP_001305148; NP_009117	NP_001123471; NP_001123472; NP_032409; NP_796191
Location (UCSC)	Chr 20: 35.46 – 35.52 Mb	Chr 2: 155.8 – 155.84 Mb
PubMed search
- Wikidata
View/Edit Human	View/Edit Mouse

Centrosome-associated protein CEP250 is a protein that in humans is encoded by the CEP250 gene. This gene encodes a core centrosomal protein required for centriole-centriole cohesion during interphase of the cell cycle. The encoded protein dissociates from the centrosomes when parental centrioles separate at the beginning of mitosis. The protein associates with and is phosphorylated by NIMA-related kinase 2, which is also associated with the centrosome. Furthermore, CEP135 is also required for the centriolar localization of CEP250.
