= TRNA (guanine37-N1)-methyltransferase =

tRNA (guanine^{37}-N^{1})-methyltransferase

Identifiers
- EC no.: 2.1.1.228

Databases
- BRENDA: enzyme data
- ExPASy: NiceZyme view
- KEGG: enzyme entry
- MetaCyc: metabolic pathway
- Rhea: reactions
- PDB structures: RCSB PDB PDBe PDBsum
Search
- PMC: articles
- PubMed: articles
- NCBI: proteins

TRMT5

Identifiers
- Aliases: TRMT5, KIAA1393, TRM5, COXPD26, tRNA methyltransferase 5
- External IDs: OMIM: 611023; MGI: 1923607; GeneCards: TRMT5
Enzyme activity
EC #	BRENDA	ExPASy	KEGG	MetaCyc
2.1.1.228	↗	↗	↗	↗

Gene location (Human)
Chr.	Chromosome 14 (human)
Band	14q23.1	Start	60,971,441 bp
Band	14q23.1	End	60,981,170 bp

Gene location (Mouse)
Chr.	Chromosome 12 (mouse)
Band	12|12 C3	Start	73,326,785 bp
Band	12|12 C3	End	73,333,484 bp
RNA expression pattern
Bgee	Human / Mouse (ortholog); Top expressed in: sperm; secondary oocyte; Achilles tendon; gonad; cartilage tissue; tibialis anterior muscle; testicle; islet of Langerhans; right testis; ganglionic eminence / Top expressed in: spermatocyte; genital tubercle; tail of embryo; zygote; spermatid; myocardium of ventricle; epiblast; embryo; embryo; cardiac muscles; More reference expression data
BioGPS	n/a
Gene ontology
Molecular function	methyltransferase activity; transferase activity; tRNA (guanine-N1-)-methyltransferase activity; tRNA (guanine(37)-N(1))-methyltransferase activity; tRNA methyltransferase activity
Cellular component	cytoplasm; mitochondrial matrix; mitochondrion; nucleus
Biological process	methylation; tRNA methylation; mitochondrial tRNA methylation; tRNA processing; tRNA N1-guanine methylation
Sources:Amigo / QuickGO
Orthologs
Databases	NCBI: entry; OMA: entry
Species	Human	Mouse
Entrez	57570	76357
Ensembl	ENSG00000126814	ENSMUSG00000034442
UniProt	Q32P41	Q9D0C4
RefSeq (mRNA)	NM_020810; NM_001350253; NM_001350254	NM_029580
RefSeq (protein)	NP_065861; NP_001337182; NP_001337183	NP_083856
Location (UCSC)	Chr 14: 60.97 – 60.98 Mb	Chr 12: 73.33 – 73.33 Mb
PubMed search
- Wikidata
View/Edit Human	View/Edit Mouse

tRNA (guanine^{37}-N^{1})-methyltransferase (EC 2.1.1.228, TrmD, tRNA (m1G37) methyltransferase, transfer RNA (m1G37) methyltransferase, Trm5p, TRMT5, tRNA-(N1G37) methyltransferase, MJ0883 (gene)) is an enzyme with systematic name S-adenosyl-L-methionine:tRNA (guanine^{37}-N^{1})-methyltransferase. This enzyme catalyses the following chemical reaction

S-adenosyl-L-methionine + guanine^{37} in tRNA $\rightleftharpoons$ S-adenosyl-L-homocysteine + N^{1}-methylguanine^{37} in tRNA

This enzyme is important for the maintenance of the correct reading frame during translation.
