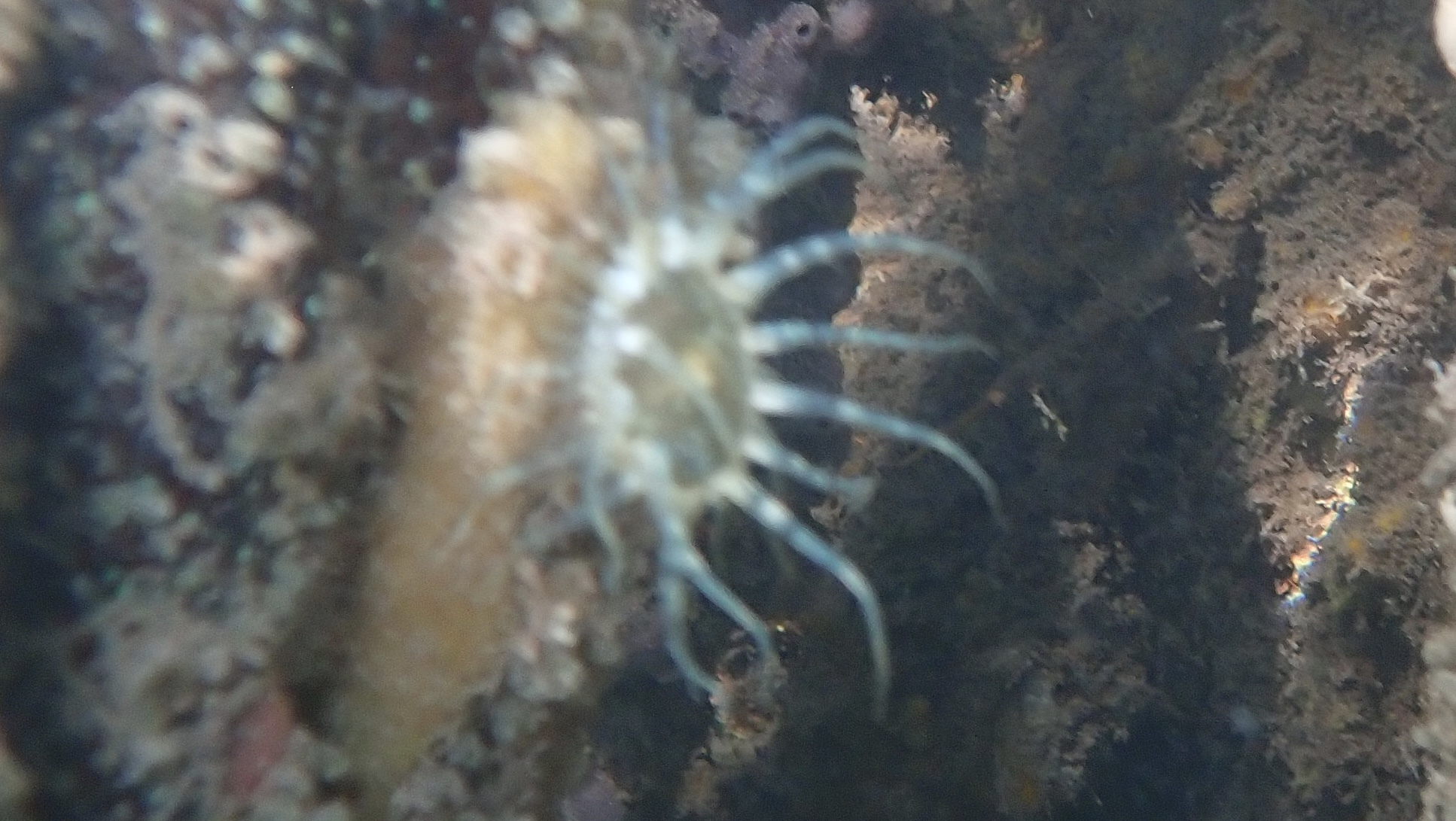

Scientific classification
- Kingdom: Animalia
- Phylum: Cnidaria
- Subphylum: Anthozoa
- Class: Hexacorallia
- Order: Actiniaria
- Family: Aiptasiidae
- Genus: Exaiptasia
- Species: E. diaphana

Binomial name
- Exaiptasia diaphana (Rapp, 1829)

= Exaiptasia diaphana =

Species of sea anemone

Exaiptasia diaphana, the pale anemone, is a species of sea anemone in the genus Exaiptasia.

== Description ==
Exaiptasia diaphana is semitranslucent brown, gray, or white. The brown color is caused by the mutualistic photosynthetic zooxanthellae, Symbiodinium microadriaticum, found in the anemone's tissue. E. diaphana has up to 96 tentacles with two rows of cinclides that have protruding acontia that all encircle the oral disk. The acontia can be protruded when the anemone is disturbed. The tentacles can have a spread of up to 8 cm (3 in). The body can grow up to 5.1 cm (2 in) tall and 1.3 cm (0.5 in) wide.

== Ecology ==
Exaiptasia diaphana is prey for the sea slugs Berghia coerulescens and Spurilla neapolitana.
