= C10orf67 =

Protein-coding gene in the species Homo sapiens

Identifiers
- Aliases: C10orf67, C10orf115, LINC01552, bA215C7.4, chromosome 10 open reading frame 67
- External IDs: MGI: 1918087; HomoloGene: 82326; GeneCards: C10orf67; OMA:C10orf67 - orthologs

Gene location (Human)
Chr.	Chromosome 10 (human)
Band	10p12.2	Start	23,202,696 bp
Band	10p12.2	End	23,344,845 bp

Gene location (Mouse)
Chr.	Chromosome 2 (mouse)
Band	2 A3|2	Start	19,467,648 bp
Band	2 A3|2	End	19,558,725 bp
RNA expression pattern
Bgee	Human / Mouse (ortholog); Top expressed in: buccal mucosa cell; tendon of biceps brachii; right uterine tube; olfactory zone of nasal mucosa; right testis; left testis; testicle; bronchial epithelial cell; secondary oocyte; right lung / Top expressed in: spermatid; embryo; seminiferous tubule; lumbar spinal ganglion; spermatocyte; lumbar subsegment of spinal cord; blastocyst; digastric muscle; vastus lateralis muscle; gastrula; More reference expression data
BioGPS	n/a
Orthologs
Species	Human	Mouse
Entrez	256815	70909
Ensembl	ENSG00000179133	ENSMUSG00000026734
UniProt	Q8IYJ2	Q8CET2
RefSeq (mRNA)	NM_153714; NM_001351306; NM_001365862; NM_001371909	NM_027600
RefSeq (protein)	NP_714925; NP_001338235; NP_001352791; NP_001358838	NP_081876
Location (UCSC)	Chr 10: 23.2 – 23.34 Mb	Chr 2: 19.47 – 19.56 Mb
PubMed search
- Wikidata
View/Edit Human	View/Edit Mouse

Chromosome 10 open reading frame 67 (C10orf67), also known as C10orf115, LINC01552, and BA215C7.4, is an un-characterized human protein-coding gene. Several studies indicate a possible link between genetic polymorphisms of this and several other genes to chronic inflammatory barrier diseases such as Crohn's Disease and sarcoidosis.

== Gene ==
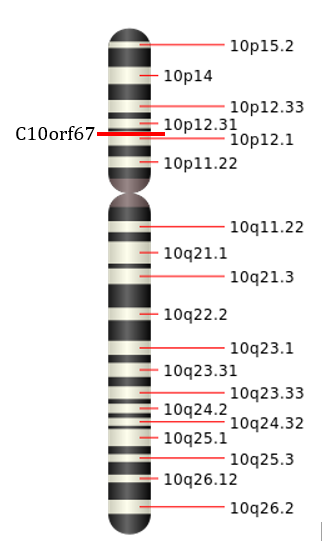
A map of Chromosome 10 with the location of C10orf67 marked in red

The gene spans 142,366 base pairs and is located at the 10p12.2 locus on the minus (-) or sense strand of chromosome 10. It is flanked upstream by the gene ARMC3 and downstream by the gene KIAA1217. These genes are approximately 150,000 bp and 350,000 bp from C10orf67, respectively.

This segment depicts approximately 1,700,000 base pairs of chromosome 10. The green lines indicate the start of transcription while the red diamonds indicate the termination of transcription. C10orf67 is transcribed in the opposite direction of its flanking genes, which are located on the anti-sense strand.

=== Transcript ===
There are 23 alternatively spliced exons, which encode 13 transcript variants. The primary transcript, only 2943 bp, is not well conserved among orthologs, rather, the X2 variant, 3417 bp, has far greater identity with orthologous proteins. This X2 transcript variant contains 15 exons which yield a polypeptide of 551 amino acids.

== Protein ==
=== General properties ===
Property	Preprotein	Cleaved protein	Mature protein
Amino Acid length	551	515	515
Isoelectric Point	9.3	8.6	8.3-8.9*
Molecular Weight	63 kDa	59 kDa	~59-61 kDa**

*depending on post-translational modifications (PTMs)

**From no PTMs - all possible PTMs

The isoelectric point is significantly greater than average for human proteins (6.81).

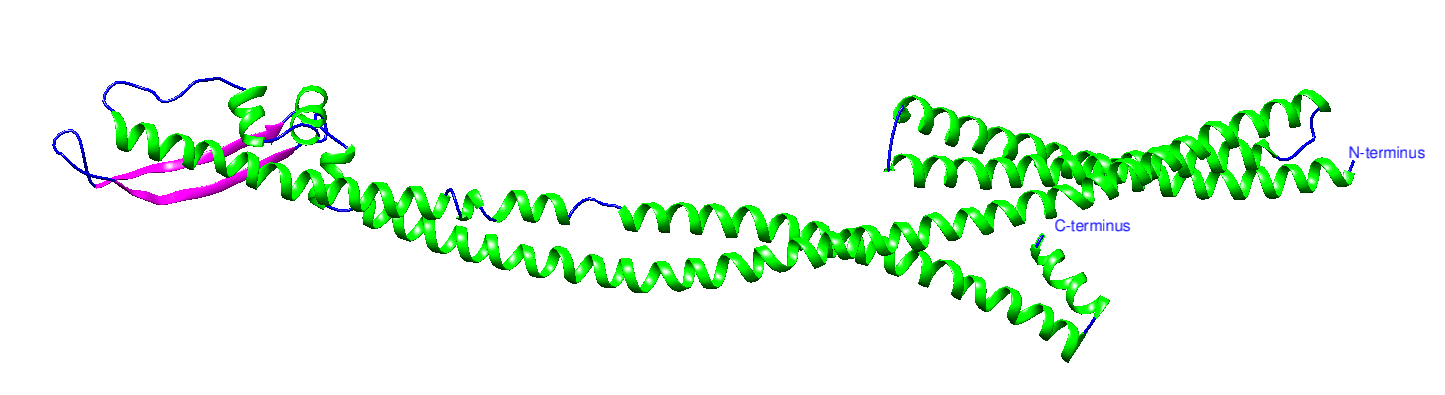
Predicted tertiary structure of C10orf67 generated by software. Based on a protein template covering 74% of the protein sequence with 96% identity.

=== Structure ===
Shown to the right is a predicted tertiary structure of the protein. It is marked by long alpha-helices with several coil regions and beta strands localized to the end of the protein opposite the N- and C- terminal ends.

=== Expression ===
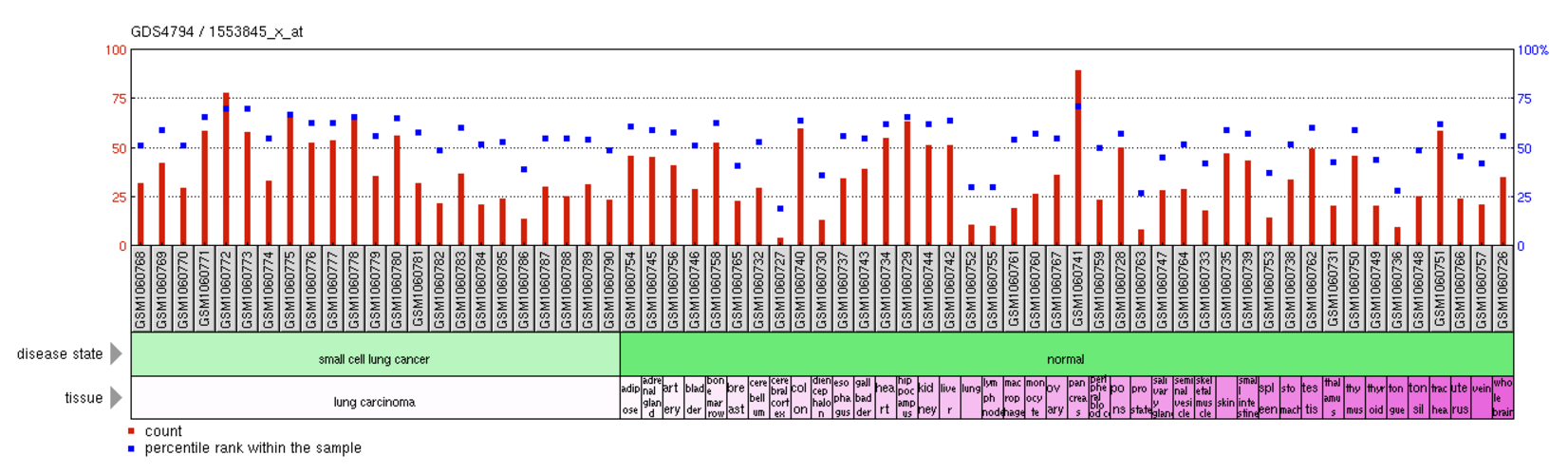
Expression of C10orf67 in various tissues.

C10orf67 is moderately expressed (50-75%) in most tissues in the body. However, a study on NCBI GEO discussing the influence of interleukin-13 (IL-13) on gene expression found that protein expression dropped to zero in the presence of IL-13 in airway epithelia.

=== Subcellular localization ===
The protein contains a mitochondrial signal peptide localizing it to the mitochondrial matrix. Analysis with subcellular localization software confirmed this finding. However, some orthologs were also predicted to localize in the nucleus. Though the high isoelectric point of the Human protein provides further evidence for the mitochondrial localization due to the high pH of the mitochondrial matrix.

=== Post-translational modifications ===
==== Cleavage sites ====
The protein is initially cleaved to remove the 36 amino acid N-terminal signal peptide after it is localized to the mitochondrion.

==== Phosphorylation ====
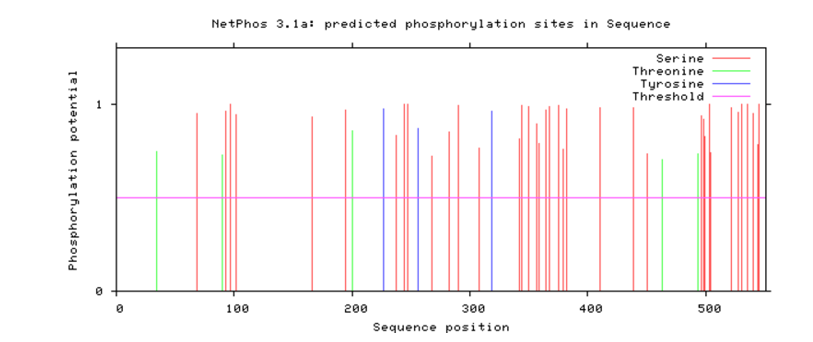
The possible phosphorylation sites of C10orf67. The concentration of possible phosphorylation sites is far greater near the C-terminus of the protein and far lower near the N-terminus, which contains the signal peptide.

There are a number of predicted phosphorylation sites, however there is one experimentally-confirmed phosphorylation site at threonine 69. The other phosphorylation sites are summarized in the protein diagram below.

==== Sumoylation ====
There are five predicted sumoylation sites within C10orf67. These are summarized by the following table:

No.	Pos.	Group	Score
1	K461	NSFHV LKNE MFTRH	0.91
2	K401	MPKKA LKED QAVVE	0.91
3	K224	EVIKE LKEE LDQYK	0.91
4	K136	KFEDR LKEE SLS L	0.91
5	K130	KQLLQ LKFE DRLKE	0.91

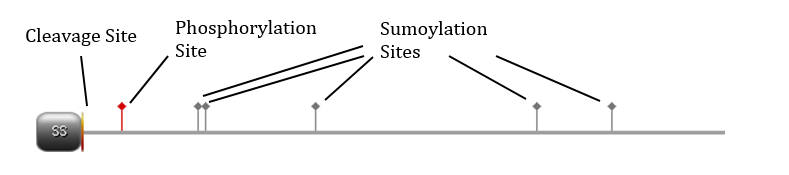
Post translational modifications of C10orf67. The N-terminus is on the left with the 36 amino acid signal peptide and the C-terminus is on the right.

== Homology and evolution ==
=== Evolution ===
C10orf67 has no known paralogs but has many orthologs within eukaryotes and retains significant identity with species as distantly related as invertebrates. Several select orthologs are listed below with some identifying information.

Genus and species	Common name	Organism Type	Time Since Last Common Ancestor (million years ago)	Accession # (NCBI)	Sequence length	% Identity	Isoelectric Point (pre-protein)
Homo Sapiens	Humans	Primate	0	XP_016871518	551	100	9.3
Pan troglodytes	Chimpanzee	Primate	6.65	XP_009456334	573	95	9.27
Macaca nemestrina	Southern pig-tailed macaque	Primate	29.44	XP_011736768	572	88.1	9.17
Bubalus bubalis	Water Buffalo	Mammal	96	XP_006080042	565	56.6	6.24
Felis catus	Cat	Mammal	96	XP_019689630	560	55.1	7.68
Sus scrofa	Wild Boar	Mammal	96	XP_013835714	515	55	6.53
Panthera pardus	Leopard	Mammal	96	XP_019316071	504	53.9	6.24
Ovis aries	Sheep	Mammal	96	XP_012043724	516	53.6	6.61
Mustela putorius furo	Ferret	Mammal	96	XP_012914379	566	50.8	9.34
Castor canadensis	Beaver	Mammal	90	XP_020038711	617	44	8.92
Mus musculus	Mouse	Mammal	90	NP_081876	560	43.6	5.89
Myotis lucifugus	Little Brown Bat	Mammal	96	XP_014316001	598	38.9	6.22
Myotis brandtii	Brandt's bat	Mammal	96	XP_014394869	639	38.3	6.7
Elephantulus edwardii	Cape elephant shrew	Mammal	105	XP_006887164	493	37.9	5.62
Gallus gallus	Chicken	Bird	312	XP_003640687	430	26.3	5.44
Astyanax mexicanus	Mexican Tetra	Fish	435	XP_007253068	475	26.1	4.76
Lepisosteus oculatus	Spotted Gar	Fish	435	XP_015208957	479	25.2	6.73
Danio rerio	Zebrafish	Fish	435	XP_698346	461	24.5	5.93
Salmo salar	Atlantic Salmon	Fish	435	XP_013995887	455	21.6	6.18
Amphimedon queenslandica	Reniera	Invertebrate	951.8	XP_011402872	513	24.1	7.05
Branchiostoma belcheri	Branchiostoma	Invertebrate	684	XP_019645941	563	23.5	6.24

=== Evolution ===
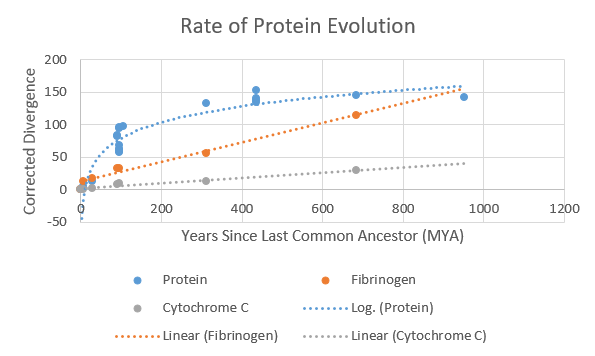
The rate of evolution of C10orf67 relative to Fibrinogen and Cytochrome c.

The rate of evolution of C10orf67 was compared to that of fibrinogen and cytochrome c, which represent fast and slow rates of evolution, respectively. The bolded species in the table were selected to represent the fibrinogen and cytochrome c orthologs to determine the rate of evolution of the respective proteins.

The rate of evolution of C10orf67 is very curious in that it follows a logarithmic trend rather than a linear trend, like most proteins.

== Clinical significance ==
=== Sarcoidosis ===
While the function of C10orf67 is unknown, its interactions with IL-13 further suggest a role of C10orf67 in sarcoidosis as the disease is known to involve various interleukins.

=== Cancer ===
While several NCBI GEO profiles examining various factors on gene expression show that C10orf67 is expressed in varying levels in different cancer tissues, the mitochondrial localization may yield some insight as to a clinical function. Mitochondria have been shown to have some influence in cell proliferation. Given the high energy demand from cell proliferation, there have been several hypotheses that the mitochondria may play a role in the cell cycle and that C10orf67, being localized to the mitochondria, may have a hand in this as well.
