= Detyrosination =

Detyrosination is a reversible posttranslational modification that occurs on alpha-tubulin, in which the C-terminal tyrosine is removed to expose the preceding glutamate. Tubulin polymers, called microtubules, that contain detyrosinated alpha-tubulin are usually referred to as Glu-microtubules while unmodified polymers are called Tyr-microtubules.

Detyrosination of alpha-tubulin is performed by vasohibins on alpha-tubulin incorporated into assembled, stabilized microtubule polymers. Tubulin detyrosination is reversed by tubulin-tyrosine ligase.

Most microtubules are very dynamic, and do not contain much detyrosinated tubulin. Although, highly stabilized microtubule-based structures like ciliary axonemes often contain more detyrosinated tubulin. For example, the A-subtubules of microtubule doublets in the flagella of C. reinhardtii are more highly detyrosinated than the B-subtubules.

The detyrosinating activity was first identified in the late 1970s.

== See also ==
- Polyglutamylation
- Polyglycylation
- Acetylation
