= Tubulin beta-4A chain =

Protein-coding gene in the species Homo sapiens

TUBB4A
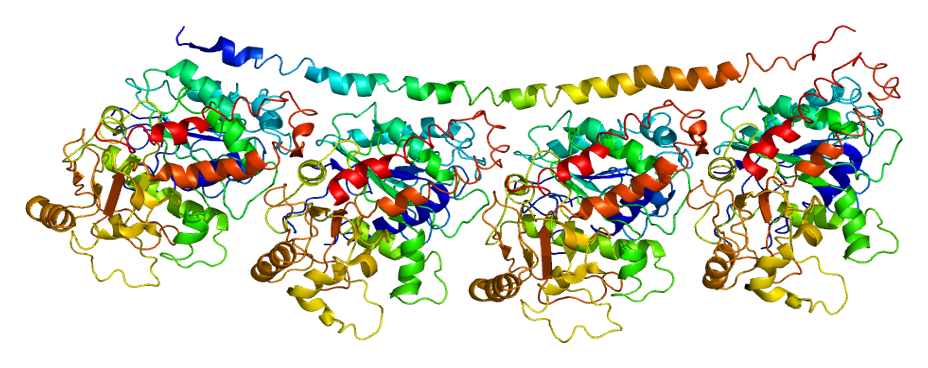

Identifiers
- Aliases: TUBB4A, DYT4, TUBB4, TUBB5, beta-5, tubulin beta 4A class IVa
- External IDs: OMIM: 602662; MGI: 107848; GeneCards: TUBB4A

Gene location (Human)
Chr.	Chromosome 19 (human)
Band	19p13.3	Start	6,494,319 bp
Band	19p13.3	End	6,502,848 bp

Gene location (Mouse)
Chr.	Chromosome 17 (mouse)
Band	17 D|17 29.66 cM	Start	57,387,066 bp
Band	17 D|17 29.66 cM	End	57,394,782 bp
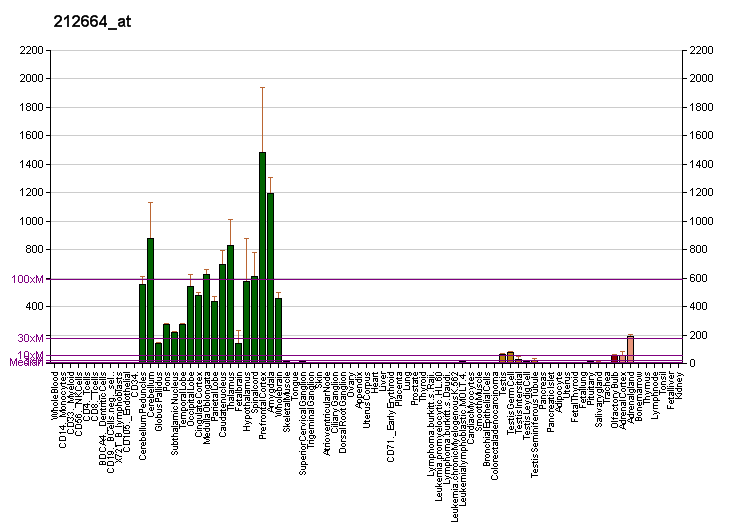
RNA expression pattern
Bgee	Human / Mouse (ortholog); Top expressed in: right hemisphere of cerebellum; Brodmann area 10; C1 segment; right frontal lobe; paraflocculus of cerebellum; middle frontal gyrus; anterior cingulate cortex; amygdala; caudate nucleus; internal globus pallidus / Top expressed in: primary visual cortex; CA3 field; perirhinal cortex; superior frontal gyrus; cerebellar cortex; entorhinal cortex; dentate gyrus of hippocampal formation granule cell; central gray substance of midbrain; neural layer of retina; supraoptic nucleus; More reference expression data
BioGPS	More reference expression data
Gene ontology
Molecular function	nucleotide binding; GTP binding; structural constituent of cytoskeleton; protein binding; GTPase activity; calcium ion binding
Cellular component	cytoplasm; cytosol; cell projection; myelin sheath; internode region of axon; cilium; soma; microtubule; extracellular exosome; cytoskeleton; nucleus; microtubule cytoskeleton; axoneme
Biological process	G2/M transition of mitotic cell cycle; microtubule-based process; cytoskeleton organization; ciliary basal body-plasma membrane docking; negative regulation of microtubule polymerization; regulation of G2/M transition of mitotic cell cycle; microtubule cytoskeleton organization; mitotic cell cycle
Sources:Amigo / QuickGO
Orthologs
Databases	NCBI: entry; OMA: entry
Species	Human	Mouse
Entrez	10382	22153
Ensembl	ENSG00000104833	ENSMUSG00000062591
UniProt	P04350	Q9D6F9
RefSeq (mRNA)	NM_006087; NM_001289123; NM_001289127; NM_001289129; NM_001289130 NM_001289131	NM_009451
RefSeq (protein)	NP_001276052; NP_001276056; NP_001276058; NP_001276059; NP_001276060 NP_006078	NP_033477
Location (UCSC)	Chr 19: 6.49 – 6.5 Mb	Chr 17: 57.39 – 57.39 Mb
PubMed search
- Wikidata
View/Edit Human	View/Edit Mouse

Tubulin beta-4A chain is a protein that in humans is encoded by the TUBB4A gene. Two tubulin beta-4 chain proteins are encoded in the human genome by the genes TUBB4A (this entry) and TUBB4B. Tubulin is the major constituent of microtubules, a key components of the cytoskeleton. It binds two molecules of GTP, one at an exchangeable site on the beta-chain and one at a non-exchangeable site on the alpha-chain. TUBB4A is preferentially and highly expressed in the central nervous system.

== Clinical significance ==
Mutations in TUBB4A have been associated with two neurological disorders.

An R2G substitution in the autoregulatory MREI domain of TUBB4A has been identified as the cause of 'hereditary whispering dysphonia' or DYT4.

A de novo D249N mutation has been identified as the cause of a rare leukoencephalopathy, hypomyelination with atrophy of basal ganglia and cerebellum (H-ABC).

Mutations in TUBB4A are associated with Pelizaeus–Merzbacher disease.
