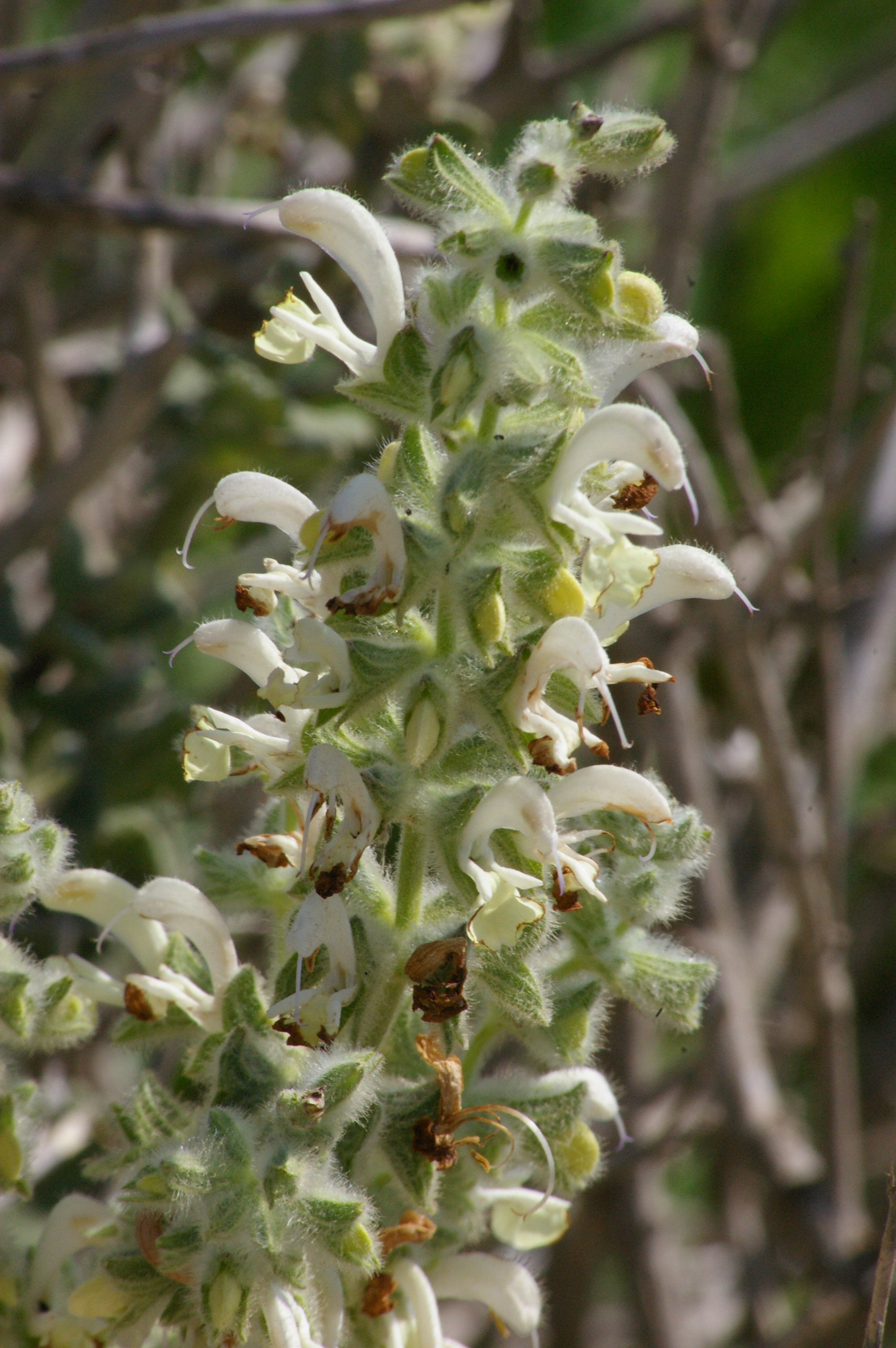

Scientific classification
- Kingdom: Plantae
- Clade: Tracheophytes
- Clade: Angiosperms
- Clade: Eudicots
- Clade: Asterids
- Order: Lamiales
- Family: Lamiaceae
- Genus: Salvia
- Species: S. dominica

Binomial name
- Salvia dominica L.

Synonyms
- Salvia graveolens Vahl

= Salvia dominica =

Species of flowering plant

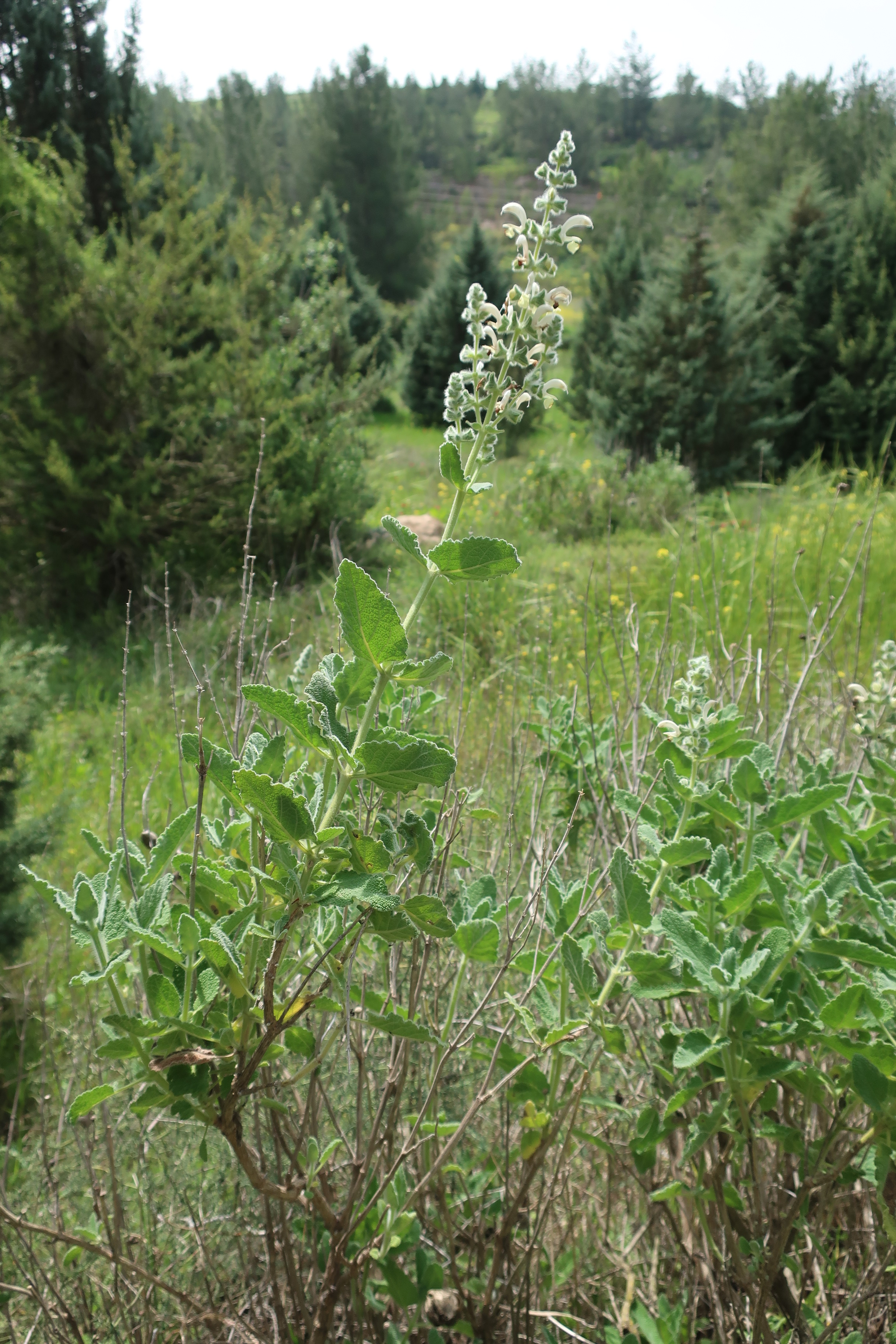
Salvia dominica growing in the hill country of Judea

Salvia dominica (Dominica sage, in Arabic ( Maru = مرو or "Khowwekha" = خويخة ), in (Hebrew: מרווה, marva) is a strong-scented perennial shrub found throughout the eastern Mediterranean, especially Jordan Israel, Lebanon and Syria. The branched inflorescence is one of several salvias thought to have inspired the design of the menorah. It grows to about 1 meter in height and width, and blooms in spring or early summer with pale yellow and white flowers in delicate whorls.

== Biological properties ==
A group of Italian and Jordanian researchers isolated twenty-four new sesterterpenes, some of them with interesting biological activity due to their interaction with tubulin-tyrosine ligase (TTL), an enzyme involved in the tyrosination cycle of the C-terminus of tubulin, and inhibit TTL activity in cancer cells.

== ٍSee also ==
- List of Salvia species
