= LTK =

LTK may refer to

- Latakia International Airport, Syria (IATA code).
- Legends of the Three Kingdoms, a Chinese popular card game based on the Three Kingdoms period of China and the semi-fictional novel Romance of the Three Kingdoms (ROTK).
- Leukocyte receptor tyrosine kinase, in biochemistry, a member of the receptor tyrosine kinase family of cell surface receptors
- Licence to Kill, 1989 James Bond film
- LIKEtoKNOW.it, shopping app which became LTK in 2021
- Little Kimble railway station, England; National Rail station code LTK
- Professional cycling teams with UCI code LTK
  - Lidl–Trek (men's team)
  - Lidl–Trek (women's team)
- LTK Commune
