= Enrico Mini =

Emeritus professor

- Occupations: Oncologist, pharmacologist, and academic

Academic background
- Education: M.D., Specialty degree, Oncology; Ph.D., Pharmacology and Toxicology
- Alma mater: University of Florence; University of Modena

Enrico Mini is an oncologist, pharmacologist, and academic. He is an emeritus professor at the University of Florence.

Mini's research interests include cancer pharmacology, tumor drug resistance, and the pharmacogenomics of anticancer therapies, with a focus on colorectal cancer, other gastrointestinal neoplasms, leukemia, and lymphoma. He was the director of the Unit of Translational Oncology at Careggi University Hospital and the head of the Laboratory of Cancer Pharmacology and Chemotherapy at the University of Florence.

== Education ==
Mini earned an M.D. from the University of Florence in 1977. In 1980, he received a specialty degree in Oncology from the University of Modena, followed by a Ph.D. in Pharmacology and Toxicology in 1988 from the University of Florence.

== Career ==
Mini's academic career includes his appointment as a research scientist at the Departments of Pharmacology and Medicine of the Yale University School of Medicine from 1981 to 1984. He was appointed as a lecturer at the University of Siena from 1983 to 1987, and then began working as a lecturer at the University of Ferrara in 1988, a position he held until 1992. He was appointed as an associate professor of pharmacology at the University of Florence from 1992 to 2001, and then as professor of Pharmacology from 2001 to 2008. He was appointed as the professor of Medical Oncology at the University of Florence in 2008, and later as an emeritus professor there.

Mini was the chairman of the Cancer Section of the International Society of Chemotherapy from 2007 to 2013. Between 2011 and 2020, he was appointed as director of the Specialty School of Medical Oncology at the University of Florence. He held these positions until his retirement in 2022, after which he continued as the scientific lead of funded research projects. Since 2018, he has been the coordinator of the Oncological Pharmacology Working Group of the Italian Society of Pharmacology.

== Research ==
Mini's research contributed to clarifying the mechanisms of methotrexate (MTX), an antifolate chemotherapy agent and immunosuppressant that works by inhibiting an enzyme called dihydrofolate reductase (DHFR). In related research, it was demonstrated that polyglutamylation of methotrexate contributes to its selective cytotoxic effect.

Mini proposed that administering MTX before 5-fluorouracil (5-FU) produces a synergistic effect, since the polyglutamated MTX can replace 5,10-CH_{2}-THF in the ternary complex. He further indicated that alterations in the balance of polyglutamylated MTX forms often lead to the development of drug resistance. His studies have led to the recognition of leucovorin as a biomodulator of 5-FU cytotoxicity in preclinical experiments prompting a surge of phase I and II clinical investigations.

Mini, through his research, highlighted the negative role of permeability glycoprotein (P-gp), an ABC transporter with extensive substrate specificity in anticancer therapy for leukemia and other solid tumors. He then modified anticancer drugs to reduce P-gp-mediated efflux and underlined the need for creating drugs that are non-P-gp substrates to counter cancer resistance hindrances. In a collaborative study, he explored reversing multidrug resistance in a highly doxorubicin-resistant human colorectal adenocarcinoma cell line. The study investigated long-term treatment with an equimolar mixture of three unmodified antisense oligonucleotides targeting adjacent sites on P-gp mRNA (messenger RNA), delivered via a synthetic cationic lipid. He showed that the combination could downregulate P-gp mRNA in the doxorubicin-resistant cell line. Mini also explored the potential of gold-based complexes for their use as metallodrugs in cancer.

== Selected articles ==
- Pizzorno, G; Mini, E; Coronnello, M; McGuire, J J; Moroson, B A; Cashmore, A R; Dreyer, R N; Lin, J T (1988). "Impaired polyglutamylation of methotrexate as a cause of resistance in CCRF-CEM cells after short-term, high-dose treatment with this drug". Cancer Research. 48 (8): 2149–2155. PMID 2450647.
- McCloskey, D E; McGuire, J J; Russell, C A; Rowan, B G; Bertino, J R; Pizzorno, G; Mini, E (1991). "Decreased folylpolyglutamate synthetase activity as a mechanism of methotrexate resistance in CCRF-CEM human leukemia sublines". Journal of Biological Chemistry. 266 (10): 6181–6187. doi:10.1016/S0021-9258(18)38101-8. PMID 2007575.
- Mazzei, T; Mini, E; Novelli, A; Periti, P (1993). "Chemistry and mode of action of macrolides". Journal of Antimicrobial Chemotherapy. 31 (Suppl C): 1–9. doi:10.1093/jac/31.suppl_c.1. PMID 7683018.
- Arcangeli, A; Bianchi, L; Becchetti, A; Faravelli, L; Coronnello, M; Mini, E; Olivotto, M; Wanke, E (1995). "A novel inward-rectifying K+ current with a cell-cycle dependence governs the resting potential of mammalian neuroblastoma cells". The Journal of Physiology. 489 (Pt 2): 455–471. doi:10.1113/jphysiol.1995.sp021065. PMC 1156772. PMID 8847640.
- Messori, L; Abbate, F; Marcon, G; Orioli, P; Fontani, M; Mini, E; Mazzei, T; Carotti, S; O'Connell, T; Zanello, P (2000). "Gold(III) complexes as potential antitumor agents: solution chemistry and cytotoxic properties of some selected gold(III) compounds". Journal of Medicinal Chemistry. 43 (19): 3541–3548. doi:10.1021/jm990492u. PMID 11000008.
- Mini, E; Nobili, S; Caciagli, B; Landini, I; Mazzei, T (2006). "Cellular pharmacology of gemcitabine". Annals of Oncology. 17 (Suppl 5): v7–v12. doi:10.1093/annonc/mdj941. PMID 16807468.
- Nobili, Stefania; Mini, Enrico; Landini, Ida; Gabbiani, Chiara; Casini, Angela; Messori, Luigi (2010). "Gold compounds as anticancer agents: chemistry, cellular pharmacology, and preclinical studies". Med Res Rev. 30 (3): 550–580. doi:10.1002/med.20168. hdl:2158/386222. PMID 19634148.
- Mini, Enrico; Lapucci, Andrea; Perrone, Gabriele; D'Aurizio, Romina; Napoli, Cristina; Brugia, Marco; Landini, Ida; Tassi, Renato (2019). "RNA sequencing reveals PNN and KCNQ1OT1 as predictive biomarkers of clinical outcome in stage III colorectal cancer patients treated with adjuvant chemotherapy". International Journal of Cancer. 145 (9): 2580–2593. doi:10.1002/ijc.32326. PMID 30973654.
- Lavacchi, Daniele; Landini, Ida; Perrone, Gabriele; Roviello, Giandomenico; Mini, Enrico; Nobili, Stefania (2022). "Pharmacogenetics in diffuse large B-cell lymphoma treated with R-CHOP: Still an unmet challenge". Pharmacology & Therapeutics. 229 107924. doi:10.1016/j.pharmthera.2021.107924. hdl:2158/1256490. PMID 34175369.
