= Tubulin GTPase =

Class of enzymes

Identifiers
- EC no.: 3.6.5.6

Databases
- BRENDA: enzyme data
- ExPASy: NiceZyme view
- KEGG: enzyme entry
- MetaCyc: metabolic pathway
- Rhea: reactions
- PDB structures: RCSB PDB PDBe PDBsum
Search
- PMC: articles
- PubMed: articles
- NCBI: proteins

Tubulin GTPase (EC 3.6.5.6) is an enzyme with systematic name GTP phosphohydrolase (microtubule-releasing). This enzyme catalyses the following chemical reaction

GTP + H_{2}O $\rightleftharpoons$ GDP + phosphate

This enzyme participates in tubulin folding and division plane formation.

== See also ==
- Tubulin
