= Polyglycylation =

Post-translational modification

Polyglycylation is a form of posttranslational modification of glutamate residues of the carboxyl-terminal region tubulin in certain microtubules (e.g., axonemal) originally discovered in Paramecium, and later shown in mammalian neurons as well.

== See also ==
- Polyglutamylation
