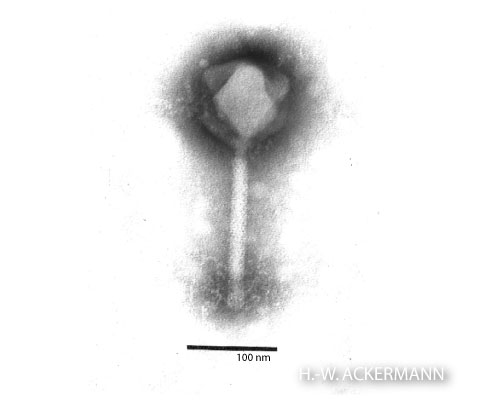
- Electron micrograph of a Pseudomonas virus phiKZ virion

Virus classification
- (unranked): Virus
- Realm: Duplodnaviria
- Kingdom: Heunggongvirae
- Phylum: Uroviricota
- Class: Caudoviricetes
- Family: Chimalliviridae

Subfamilies & Genera
- See text

= Chimalliviridae =

Family of viruses

Chimalliviridae is a family of viruses in the class Caudoviricetes.

== Taxonomy ==
The family has one subfamily with two genera:

- Gorgonvirinae
  - Aphroditevirus
  - Tidunavirus

The family has many incertae sedis genera not part of a subfamily:

- Agricanvirus
- Branisovskavirus
- Chaoshanvirus
- Chiangmaivirus
- Derbicusvirus
- Elvirus
- Eowynvirus
- Erskinevirus
- Ferozepurvirus
- Goslarvirus
- Iapetusvirus
- Ludhianavirus
- Maaswegvirus
- Machinavirus
- Meadowvirus
- Miamivirus
- Miltoncavirus
- Moabitevirus
- Nimduovirus
- Noxifervirus
- Pawinskivirus
- Petsuvirus
- Phabiovirus
- Phikzvirus
- Ripduovirus
- Risingsunvirus
- Seoulvirus
- Serwervirus
- Siatvirus
- Tepukevirus
- Wellingtonvirus
