= Phikzvirus =

- The structure of bacteriophage Phikz at atomic resolution is presented here. From left to right: The Chimera software structure is depicted, the Maestro software electrostatics structure is depicted, and the ChimeraX software hydrophilicity structure is depicted in orange-green.

Virus classification
- (unranked): Virus
- Realm: Duplodnaviria
- Kingdom: Heunggongvirae
- Phylum: Uroviricota
- Class: Caudoviricetes
- Family: Chimalliviridae
- Genus: Phikzvirus

Genus of viruses

Phikzvirus (synonym: PhiKZ-like viruses, Phikzlikevirus before 2015) is a genus of viruses in the class Caudoviricetes, in the family Chimalliviridae. Bacteria serve as natural hosts. There are three species in this genus.

Phages in this genus are considered large or "jumbo" phages due to their genome size being over 200kb in length. Three phages in this genus (φKZ, φPA3, and 201φ2-1) are known to assemble a "phage nucleus" structure similar in function to the eukaryotic cell nucleus that encloses DNA as well as replication and transcription machinery. The replicating DNA is enclosed by a 2D protein lattice currently known to be made of only the Phage Nuclear Enclosure (PhuN) protein. These phages also establish a bipolar spindle using a tubulin-like PhuZ protein which centers the phage nucleus. The Phage Nuclear Enclosure protein was dubbed chimallin (ChmA) after the chīmalli because it shields phage DNA from host defenses like restriction enzymes and CRISPR-Cas systems.

== Taxonomy ==
The following three species are assigned to the genus:

- Pseudomonas virus PA7
- Pseudomonas virus phiKZ
- Pseudomonas virus SL2

== Structure ==
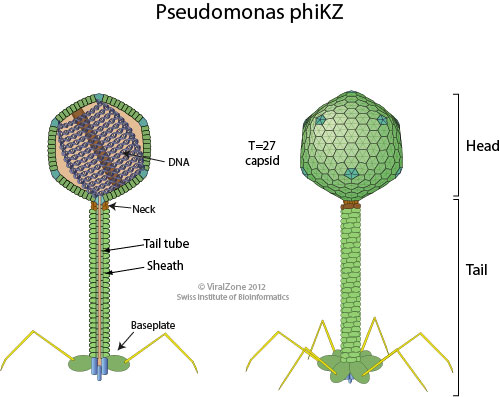
Schematic drawing of a Pseudomonas virus phiKZ virion (cross section and side view)

Phikzviruses are nonenveloped, with a head and tail. The head has icosahedral symmetry (T=27), with a relatively large diameter of about 140 nm. The tail is around 160 nm long, 35 nm wide.

Genus	Structure	Symmetry	Capsid	Genomic arrangement	Genomic segmentation
Phikzvirus	Head-Tail	T=27	Non-enveloped	Circular	Monopartite

== Genome ==
Genomes are circular, around 280kb in length. Two of the three species have been fully sequenced and are available from ICTV. They range between 211k and 280k nucleotides, with 201 to 306 proteins. The complete genomes, along with one other similar but unclassified genome, are available here.

== Life cycle ==
Viral replication is cytoplasmic. The virus attaches to the host cell using its terminal fibers, and ejects the viral DNA into the host cytoplasm via contraction of its tail sheath. DNA-templated transcription is the method of transcription. Once the viral genes have been replicated, the procapsid is assembled and packed. The tail is then assembled and the mature virions are released via lysis. Bacteria serve as the natural host. Transmission routes are passive diffusion.

Genus	Host details	Tissue tropism	Entry details	Release details	Replication site	Assembly site	Transmission
Phikzvirus	Bacteria	None	Injection	Lysis	Cytoplasm	Cytoplasm	Passive diffusion

== History ==
According to the ICTV's 2009 report, the genus PhiKZ-like viruses was first accepted as a new genus, at the same time as all three of its contained species. This proposal is available here. In 2012, the name was changed to Phikzlikevirus. This proposal is available here. The genus was later renamed Phikzvirus.
