= TUBA1B =

Protein-coding gene in the species Homo sapiens

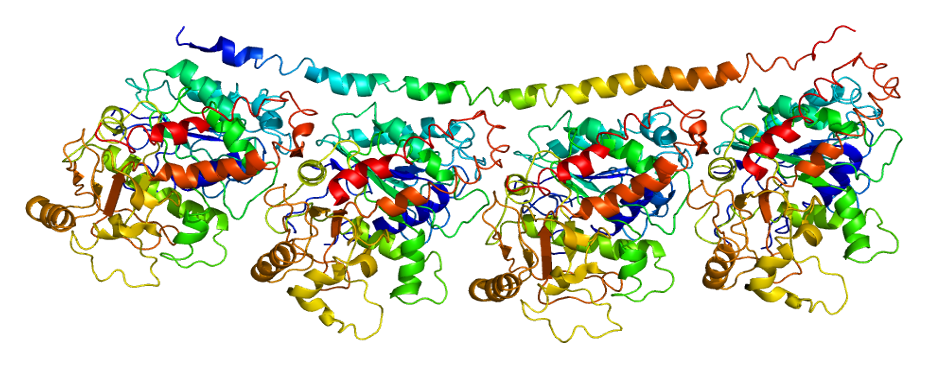

Identifiers
- Aliases: TUBA1B, K-ALPHA-1, tubulin alpha 1b
- External IDs: OMIM: 602530; MGI: 107804; GeneCards: TUBA1B
Available structures
PDB	Ortholog search: PDBe RCSB
PDB	List of PDB id codes 2E4H, 4TV8, 3RYI, 3JAR, 4TUY, 4TV9, 4YJ2, 3RYH, 3JAK, 3JAS, 4F61, 3UT5, 4O4J, 4YJ3, 4EB6, 4WBN, 3JAW, 4O2A, 3RYF, 3JAL, 4O4H, 4LNU, 3J8Y, 4IIJ, 4O4I, 3RYC, 4O4L, 4O2B, 4I50, 3JAT, 4HNA, 4F6R, 3J8X, 5CA0, 5ITZ, 5JQG, 5IJ0, 5FNV, 5IJ9

Gene location (Human)
Chr.	Chromosome 12 (human)
Band	12q13.12	Start	49,127,782 bp
Band	12q13.12	End	49,131,397 bp

Gene location (Mouse)
Chr.	Chromosome 15 (mouse)
Band	15|15 F1	Start	98,829,306 bp
Band	15|15 F1	End	98,832,446 bp
RNA expression pattern
Bgee	Human / Mouse (ortholog); Top expressed in: ventricular zone; frontal pole; superior frontal gyrus; prefrontal cortex; thalamus; Brodmann area 10; right frontal lobe; dorsolateral prefrontal cortex; cingulate gyrus; anterior cingulate cortex / Top expressed in: ventricular zone; hypothalamus; tail of embryo; mesencephalon; epiblast; neural tube; genital tubercle; dentate gyrus of hippocampal formation granule cell; cerebellar cortex; primary visual cortex; More reference expression data
BioGPS	n/a
Gene ontology
Molecular function	nucleotide binding; GTP binding; structural molecule activity; structural constituent of cytoskeleton; protein binding; GTPase activity; double-stranded RNA binding; ubiquitin protein ligase binding
Cellular component	cytoplasm; myelin sheath; cytoplasmic microtubule; microtubule; cytoskeleton; microtubule cytoskeleton; membrane raft
Biological process	cellular response to interleukin-4; cytoskeleton-dependent intracellular transport; cell division; microtubule-based process; microtubule cytoskeleton organization; mitotic cell cycle
Sources:Amigo / QuickGO
Orthologs
Databases	NCBI: entry; OMA: entry
Species	Human	Mouse
Entrez	10376	22143
Ensembl	ENSG00000123416	ENSMUSG00000023004
UniProt	P68363	P05213
RefSeq (mRNA)	NM_006082	NM_011654
RefSeq (protein)	NP_006073	NP_035784
Location (UCSC)	Chr 12: 49.13 – 49.13 Mb	Chr 15: 98.83 – 98.83 Mb
PubMed search
- Wikidata
View/Edit Human	View/Edit Mouse

Tubulin alpha-1B chain is a protein that in humans is encoded by the TUBA1B gene.

== Interactions ==
TUBA1B has been shown to interact with PIK3R1. Antibodies against tubulin alpha 1b can be used as markers for microtubules and spindles.
