= TUBG2 =

Protein-coding gene in the species Homo sapiens

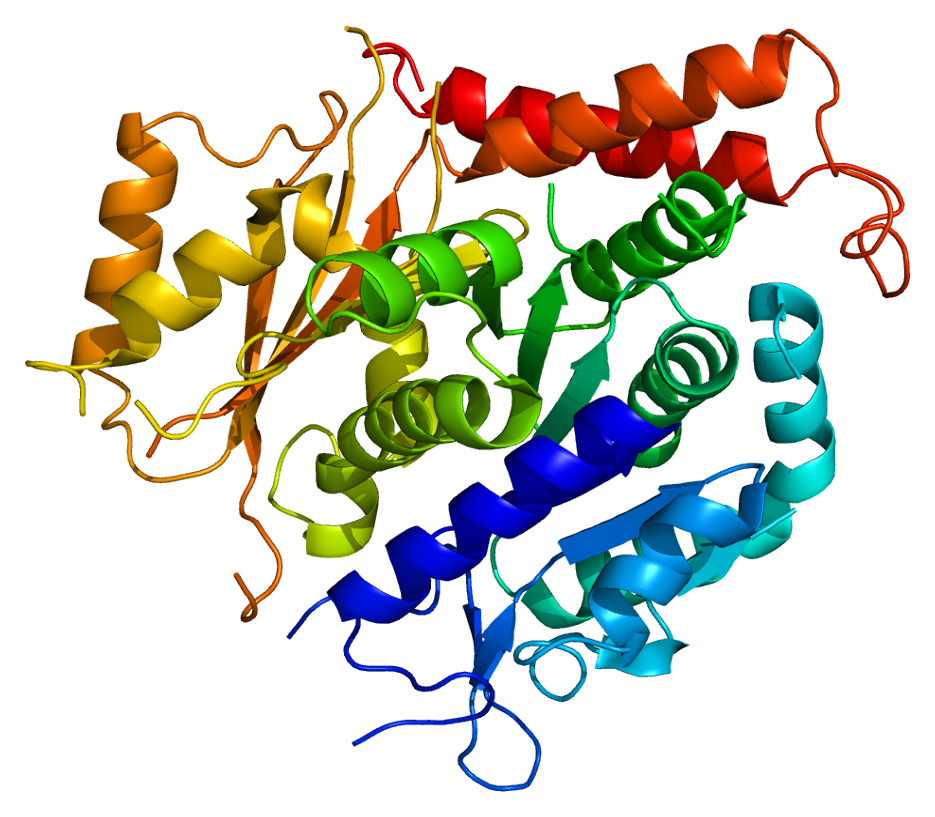

Identifiers
- Aliases: TUBG2, tubulin gamma 2
- External IDs: OMIM: 605785; MGI: 2144208; GeneCards: TUBG2

Gene location (Human)
Chr.	Chromosome 17 (human)
Band	17q21.2	Start	42,659,284 bp
Band	17q21.2	End	42,667,006 bp

Gene location (Mouse)
Chr.	Chromosome 11 (mouse)
Band	11|11 D	Start	101,046,733 bp
Band	11|11 D	End	101,052,613 bp
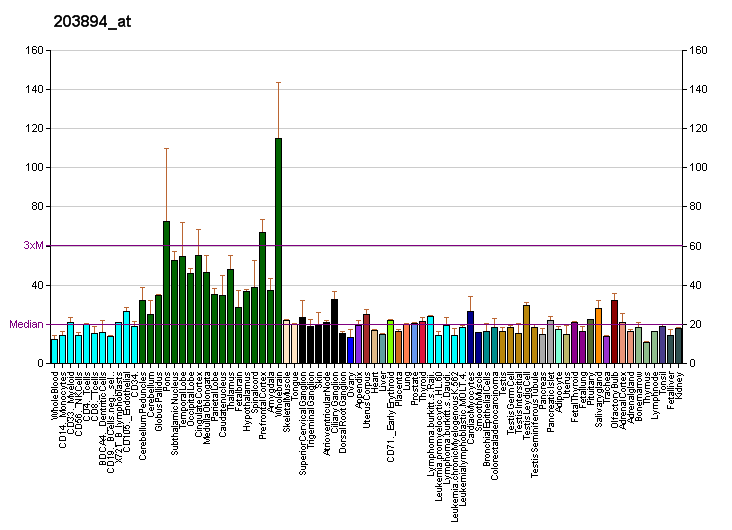
RNA expression pattern
Bgee	Human / Mouse (ortholog); Top expressed in: right frontal lobe; right hemisphere of cerebellum; anterior cingulate cortex; prefrontal cortex; body of pancreas; amygdala; Brodmann area 9; C1 segment; nucleus accumbens; caudate nucleus / Top expressed in: zygote; secondary oocyte; primary oocyte; incisor; superior frontal gyrus; dentate gyrus of hippocampal formation granule cell; primary visual cortex; dorsomedial hypothalamic nucleus; superior colliculus; neural layer of retina; More reference expression data
BioGPS	More reference expression data
Gene ontology
Molecular function	nucleotide binding; GTP binding; structural molecule activity; GTPase activity; structural constituent of cytoskeleton
Cellular component	cytoplasm; microtubule cytoskeleton; microtubule organizing center; cytoplasmic microtubule; cytosol; centrosome; spindle microtubule; gamma-tubulin complex; pericentriolar material; cytoskeleton; microtubule; nucleus; spindle
Biological process	cytoplasmic microtubule organization; microtubule nucleation; microtubule-based process; mitotic sister chromatid segregation; meiotic spindle organization; microtubule cytoskeleton organization; mitotic cell cycle; mitotic spindle organization
Sources:Amigo / QuickGO
Orthologs
Databases	NCBI: entry; OMA: entry
Species	Human	Mouse
Entrez	27175	103768
Ensembl	ENSG00000037042	ENSMUSG00000045007
UniProt	Q9NRH3	Q8VCK3
RefSeq (mRNA)	NM_016437; NM_001320509	NM_134028
RefSeq (protein)	NP_001307438; NP_057521	NP_598789
Location (UCSC)	Chr 17: 42.66 – 42.67 Mb	Chr 11: 101.05 – 101.05 Mb
PubMed search
- Wikidata
View/Edit Human	View/Edit Mouse

Tubulin gamma-2 chain is a protein that in humans is encoded by the TUBG2 gene.
