= Tubulin—tyrosine ligase =

Class of enzymes

Identifiers
- EC no.: 6.3.2.25
- CAS no.: 60321-03-1

Databases
- BRENDA: enzyme data
- ExPASy: NiceZyme view
- KEGG: enzyme entry
- MetaCyc: metabolic pathway
- Rhea: reactions
- PDB structures: RCSB PDB PDBe PDBsum
- Gene Ontology: AmiGO / QuickGO
Search
- PMC: articles
- PubMed: articles
- NCBI: proteins

In enzymology, a tubulin—tyrosine ligase (EC 6.3.2.25) is an enzyme that catalyzes the chemical reaction

ATP + detyrosinated α-tubulin + L-tyrosine $\rightleftharpoons$ α-tubulin + ADP + phosphate

The 3 substrates of this enzyme are ATP, detyrosinated alpha-tubulin, and L-tyrosine, whereas its 3 products are alpha-tubulin, ADP, and phosphate.

This enzyme belongs to the family of ligases, specifically those forming carbon-nitrogen bonds as acid-D-amino-acid ligases (peptide synthases). The systematic name of this enzyme class is alpha-tubulin:L-tyrosine ligase (ADP-forming).
