= Leukocyte receptor tyrosine kinase =

Enzyme found in humans

LTK

Identifiers
- Aliases: LTK, TYK1, Leukocyte receptor tyrosine kinase
- External IDs: OMIM: 151520; MGI: 96840; GeneCards: LTK
Enzyme activity
EC #	BRENDA	ExPASy	KEGG	MetaCyc
2.7.10.1	↗	↗	↗	↗

Gene location (Human)
Chr.	Chromosome 15 (human)
Band	15q15.1	Start	41,503,637 bp
Band	15q15.1	End	41,513,887 bp

Gene location (Mouse)
Chr.	Chromosome 2 (mouse)
Band	2 E5|2 59.97 cM	Start	119,581,801 bp
Band	2 E5|2 59.97 cM	End	119,590,912 bp
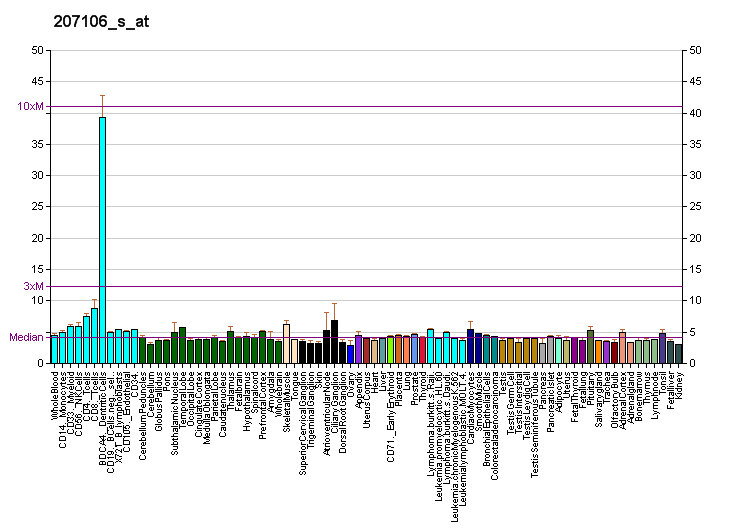

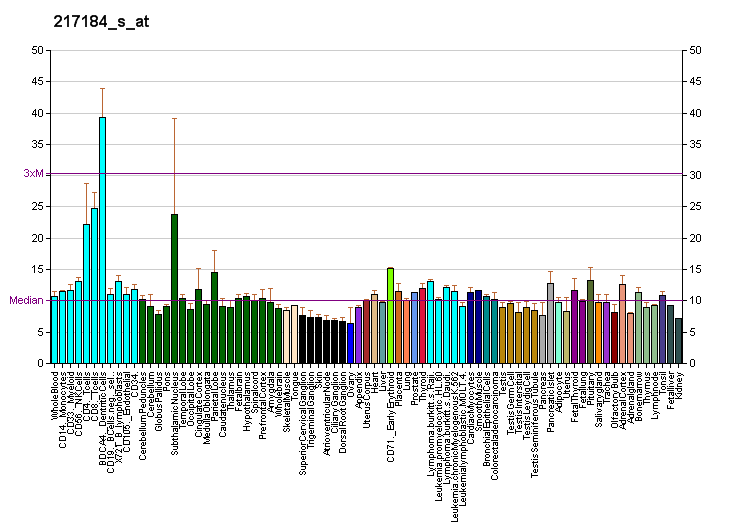
RNA expression pattern
Bgee	Human / Mouse (ortholog); Top expressed in: mucosa of transverse colon; right lung; parotid gland; testicle; upper lobe of left lung; duodenum; rectum; jejunal mucosa; olfactory zone of nasal mucosa; body of stomach / Top expressed in: perirhinal cortex; entorhinal cortex; CA3 field; Ileal epithelium; lactiferous gland; embryo; visual cortex; primary visual cortex; olfactory epithelium; superior frontal gyrus; More reference expression data
BioGPS	More reference expression data
Gene ontology
Molecular function	transferase activity; protein kinase activity; nucleotide binding; kinase activity; transmembrane receptor protein tyrosine kinase activity; protein tyrosine kinase activity; ATP binding; protein binding; receptor tyrosine kinase; transmembrane signaling receptor activity
Cellular component	integral component of membrane; membrane; plasma membrane; integral component of plasma membrane; intracellular anatomical structure; cytoplasm; receptor complex
Biological process	cellular response to retinoic acid; phosphorylation; transmembrane receptor protein tyrosine kinase signaling pathway; positive regulation of cardiac muscle cell apoptotic process; negative regulation of apoptotic process; protein phosphorylation; positive regulation of neuron projection development; phosphatidylinositol 3-kinase signaling; cell population proliferation; peptidyl-tyrosine phosphorylation; signal transduction; negative regulation of signal transduction; cell differentiation; positive regulation of ERK1 and ERK2 cascade; regulation of neuron differentiation
Sources:Amigo / QuickGO
Orthologs
Databases	NCBI: entry; OMA: entry
Species	Human	Mouse
Entrez	4058	17005
Ensembl	ENSG00000062524	ENSMUSG00000027297
UniProt	P29376	P08923
RefSeq (mRNA)	NM_001135685; NM_002344; NM_206961	NM_008523; NM_203345; NM_206941; NM_206942
RefSeq (protein)	NP_001129157; NP_002335; NP_996844	NP_032549; NP_976220; NP_996824; NP_996825
Location (UCSC)	Chr 15: 41.5 – 41.51 Mb	Chr 2: 119.58 – 119.59 Mb
PubMed search
- Wikidata
View/Edit Human	View/Edit Mouse

Leukocyte receptor tyrosine kinase is an enzyme that in humans is encoded by the LTK gene.

== Function ==
The protein encoded by this gene is a member of the ALK/LTK receptor family of receptor tyrosine kinases (RTKs) whose ligand is unknown. Closely related to the insulin receptor family of RTKs. Tyrosine-specific phosphorylation of proteins is a key to the control of diverse pathways leading to cell growth and differentiation. Two alternatively spliced transcript variants encoding different isoforms have been described for this gene.

== Interactions ==
LTK has been shown to interact with IRS-1, Shc, and PIK3R1.
