= TUBB1 =

Protein-coding gene in the species Homo sapiens

Identifiers
- Aliases: TUBB1, tubulin beta 1 class VI, MACTHC1
- External IDs: OMIM: 612901; MGI: 107814; GeneCards: TUBB1

Gene location (Human)
| Chr. | Chromosome 20 (human) |
| Band | 20q13.32 | Start | 59,019,429 bp |
| Band | 20q13.32 | End | 59,026,654 bp |

Gene location (Mouse)
| Chr. | Chromosome 2 (mouse) |
| Band | 2|2 H4 | Start | 174,292,488 bp |
| Band | 2|2 H4 | End | 174,299,675 bp |
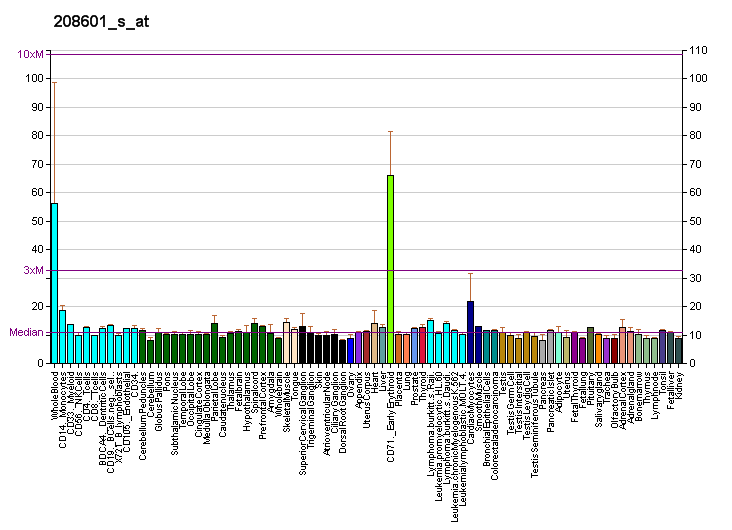
RNA expression pattern
| Bgee | Human / Mouse (ortholog); Top expressed in: monocyte; trabecular bone; blood; granulocyte; bone marrow; testicle; bone marrow cell; right lung; spleen; islet of Langerhans / Top expressed in: blood; spleen; body of femur; right lung lobe; embryo; yolk sac; bone marrow; abdominal wall; endocardial cushion; embryo; More reference expression data |
| BioGPS | More reference expression data |
Gene ontology
| Molecular function | nucleotide binding; GTP binding; structural constituent of cytoskeleton; GTPase activity |
| Cellular component | cytoplasm; microtubule; extracellular exosome; cytoskeleton; microtubule cytoskeleton |
| Biological process | spindle assembly; microtubule-based process; microtubule cytoskeleton organization; mitotic cell cycle |
Sources:Amigo / QuickGO
Orthologs
| Databases | NCBI: entry; OMA: entry |
| Species | Human | Mouse |
| Entrez | 81027 | 545486 |
| Ensembl | ENSG00000101162 | ENSMUSG00000016255 |
| UniProt | Q9H4B7 | A2AQ07 |
| RefSeq (mRNA) | NM_030773 | NM_001080971 |
| RefSeq (protein) | NP_110400 | NP_001074440 |
| Location (UCSC) | Chr 20: 59.02 – 59.03 Mb | Chr 2: 174.29 – 174.3 Mb |
| PubMed search |
- Wikidata
| View/Edit Human | View/Edit Mouse |

TUBB1 is a gene that codes for the protein Tubulin beta-1 chain in humans.
