= TUBA8 =

Protein-coding gene in the species Homo sapiens

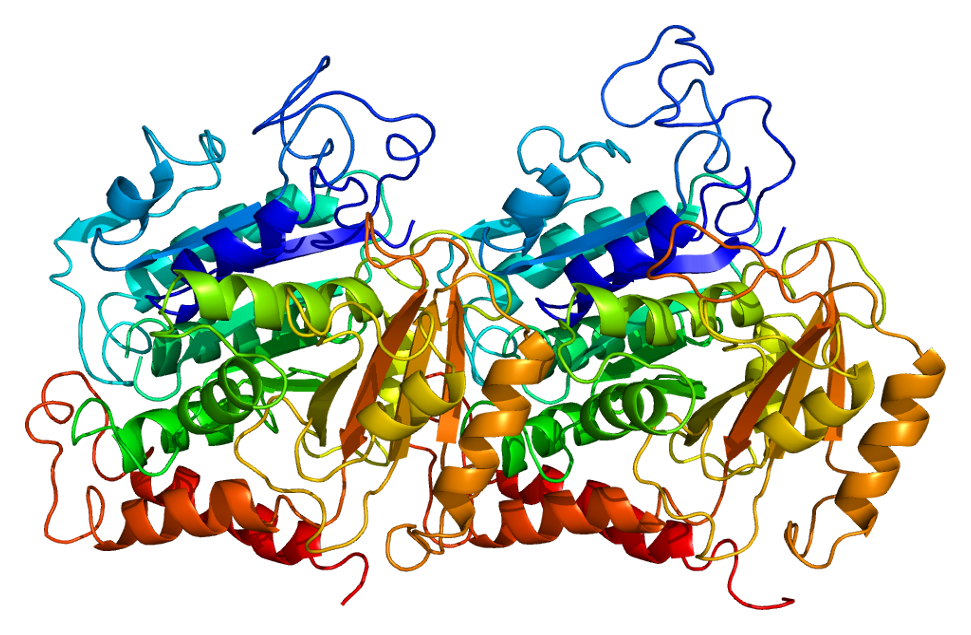

Identifiers
- Aliases: TUBA8, TUBAL2, tubulin alpha 8, CDCBM8, MACTHC2
- External IDs: OMIM: 605742; MGI: 1858225; GeneCards: TUBA8

Gene location (Human)
Chr.	Chromosome 22 (human)
Band	22q11.21	Start	18,110,100 bp
Band	22q11.21	End	18,146,683 bp

Gene location (Mouse)
Chr.	Chromosome 6 (mouse)
Band	6|6 F1	Start	121,187,655 bp
Band	6|6 F1	End	121,203,813 bp
RNA expression pattern
Bgee	Human / Mouse (ortholog); Top expressed in: muscle of thigh; gastrocnemius muscle; apex of heart; right auricle of heart; left ventricle; skeletal muscle tissue; right hemisphere of cerebellum; left testis; Brodmann area 9; gonad / Top expressed in: muscle of thigh; seminiferous tubule; triceps brachii muscle; temporal muscle; medial head of gastrocnemius muscle; sternocleidomastoid muscle; digastric muscle; right ventricle; quadriceps femoris muscle; vastus lateralis muscle; More reference expression data
BioGPS	n/a
Gene ontology
Molecular function	nucleotide binding; GTP binding; structural constituent of cytoskeleton; GTPase activity
Cellular component	cytoplasm; microtubule; cytoskeleton; microtubule cytoskeleton
Biological process	microtubule-based process; cytoskeleton organization; microtubule cytoskeleton organization; mitotic cell cycle
Sources:Amigo / QuickGO
Orthologs
Databases	NCBI: entry; OMA: entry
Species	Human	Mouse
Entrez	51807	53857
Ensembl	ENSG00000183785	ENSMUSG00000030137
UniProt	Q9NY65	Q9JJZ2
RefSeq (mRNA)	NM_018943; NM_001193414	NM_017379
RefSeq (protein)	NP_001180343; NP_061816	NP_059075
Location (UCSC)	Chr 22: 18.11 – 18.15 Mb	Chr 6: 121.19 – 121.2 Mb
PubMed search
- Wikidata
View/Edit Human	View/Edit Mouse

Tubulin alpha-8 chain is a protein that in humans is encoded by the TUBA8 gene.
