= TUBA1C =

Protein-coding gene in the species Homo sapiens

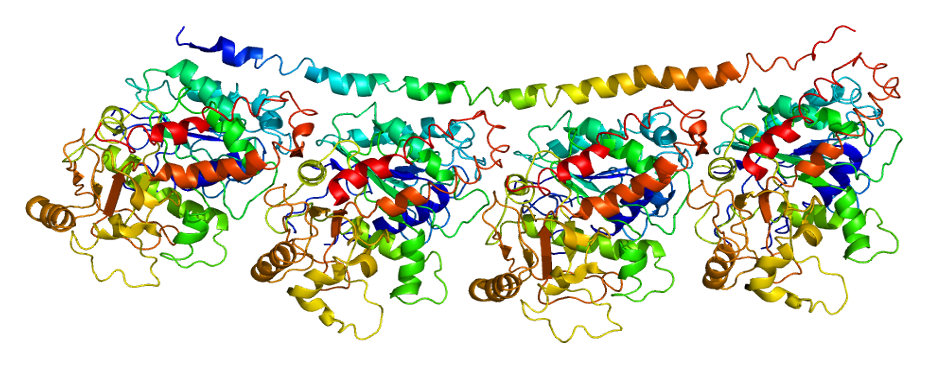

Identifiers
- Aliases: TUBA1C, TUBA6, bcm948, tubulin alpha 1c
- External IDs: MGI: 1095409; GeneCards: TUBA1C

Gene location (Human)
Chr.	Chromosome 12 (human)
Band	12q13.12	Start	49,188,736 bp
Band	12q13.12	End	49,274,600 bp

Gene location (Mouse)
Chr.	Chromosome 15 (mouse)
Band	15|15 F1	Start	98,927,772 bp
Band	15|15 F1	End	98,935,991 bp
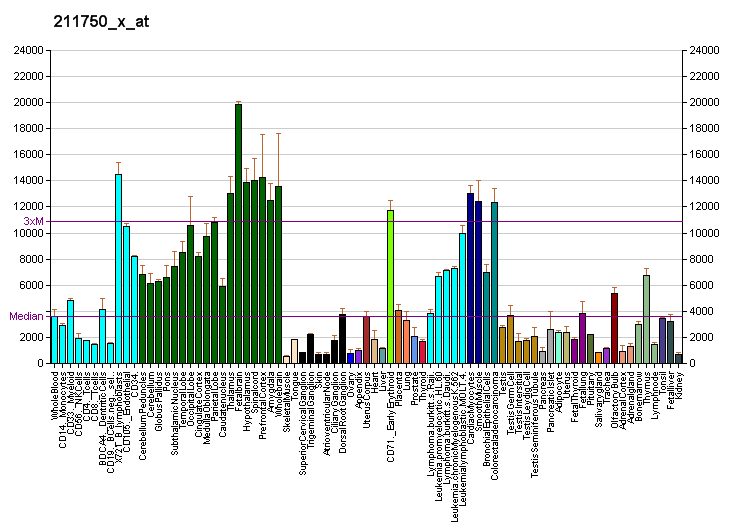

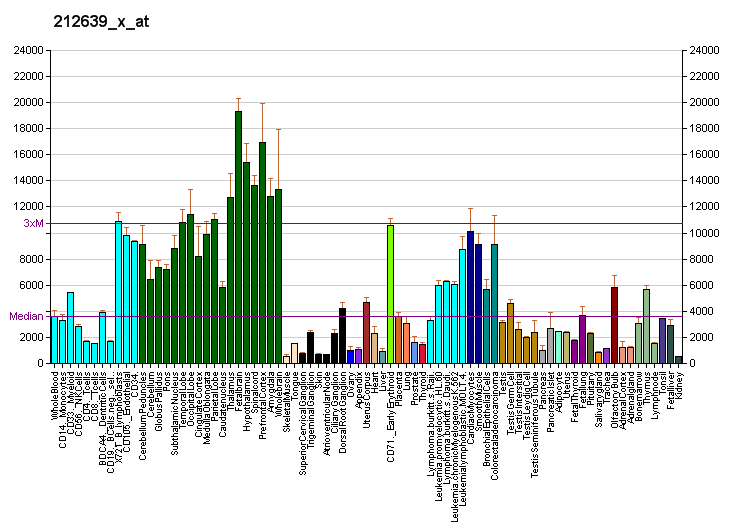
RNA expression pattern
Bgee	Human / Mouse (ortholog); Top expressed in: secondary oocyte; Brodmann area 46; spinal ganglia; orbitofrontal cortex; inferior ganglion of vagus nerve; superior vestibular nucleus; inferior olivary nucleus; pons; trigeminal ganglion; subthalamic nucleus / Top expressed in: Paneth cell; fetal liver hematopoietic progenitor cell; blastocyst; fossa; gastrula; lip; condyle; endothelial cell of lymphatic vessel; granulocyte; yolk sac; More reference expression data
BioGPS	More reference expression data
Gene ontology
Molecular function	nucleotide binding; GTP binding; structural constituent of cytoskeleton; protein binding; structural molecule activity; GTPase activity
Cellular component	cytoplasm; vesicle; microtubule; cytoskeleton; nucleus; microtubule cytoskeleton
Biological process	cytoskeleton-dependent intracellular transport; microtubule-based process; cell division; cytoskeleton organization; microtubule cytoskeleton organization; mitotic cell cycle
Sources:Amigo / QuickGO
Orthologs
Databases	NCBI: entry; OMA: entry
Species	Human	Mouse
Entrez	84790	22146
Ensembl	ENSG00000167553	ENSMUSG00000043091
UniProt	Q9BQE3	P68373
RefSeq (mRNA)	NM_032704; NM_001303114; NM_001303115; NM_001303116; NM_001303117	NM_009448
RefSeq (protein)	NP_001290043; NP_001290044; NP_001290045; NP_001290046; NP_116093	NP_033474
Location (UCSC)	Chr 12: 49.19 – 49.27 Mb	Chr 15: 98.93 – 98.94 Mb
PubMed search
- Wikidata
View/Edit Human	View/Edit Mouse

Tubulin alpha-1C chain is a protein that in humans is encoded by the TUBA1C gene.
