= Tubulin beta-4B chain =

Protein-coding gene in the species Homo sapiens

TUBB4B
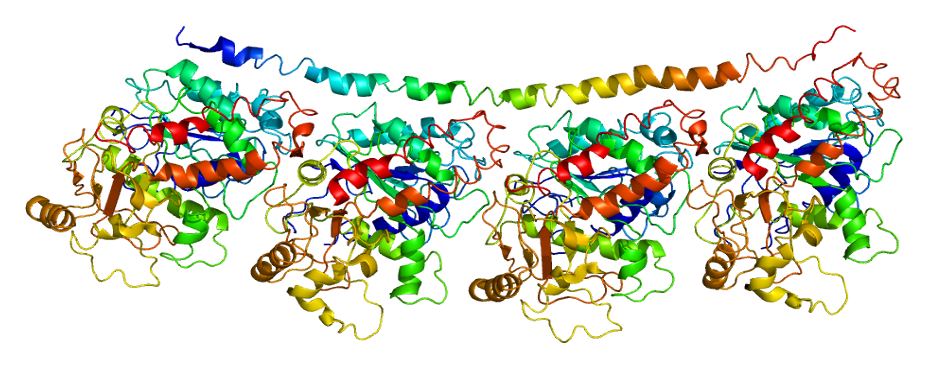

Identifiers
- Aliases: TUBB4B, Beta2, TUBB2, TUBB2C, tubulin beta 4B class IVb, LCAEOD
- External IDs: OMIM: 602660; MGI: 1915472; GeneCards: TUBB4B

Gene location (Human)
Chr.	Chromosome 9 (human)
Band	9q34.3	Start	137,241,287 bp
Band	9q34.3	End	137,243,707 bp

Gene location (Mouse)
Chr.	Chromosome 2 (mouse)
Band	2|2 A3	Start	25,112,172 bp
Band	2|2 A3	End	25,114,714 bp
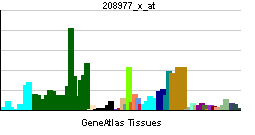

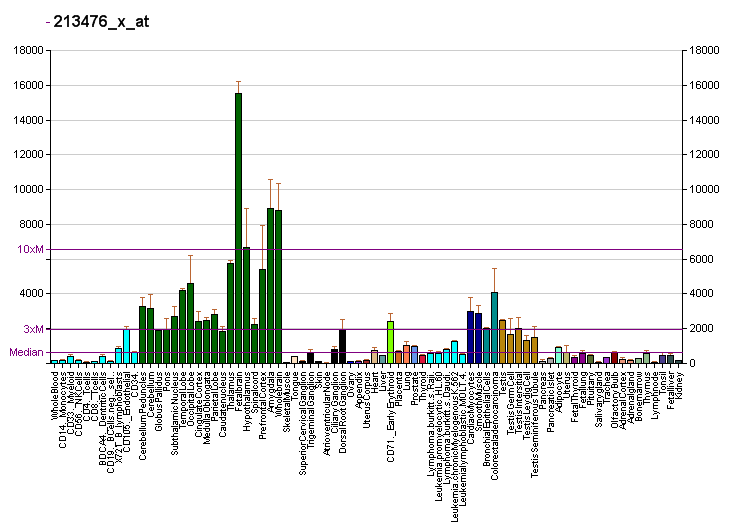
RNA expression pattern
Bgee	Human / Mouse (ortholog); Top expressed in: right testis; left testis; bronchial epithelial cell; right uterine tube; spinal ganglia; olfactory zone of nasal mucosa; pars compacta; mucosa of ileum; orbitofrontal cortex; Brodmann area 46 / Top expressed in: spermatid; testicle; spermatocyte; primary oocyte; secondary oocyte; hypothalamus; esophagus; bone marrow; lens; epiblast; More reference expression data
BioGPS	More reference expression data
Gene ontology
Molecular function	nucleotide binding; unfolded protein binding; GTP binding; structural constituent of cytoskeleton; GTPase activity; double-stranded RNA binding; MHC class I protein binding
Cellular component	cytoplasm; extracellular vesicle; cytosol; myelin sheath; microtubule; cytoskeleton; extracellular exosome; nucleus; extracellular matrix; extracellular region; microtubule cytoskeleton; azurophil granule lumen
Biological process	G2/M transition of mitotic cell cycle; microtubule-based process; natural killer cell mediated cytotoxicity; cytoskeleton organization; neutrophil degranulation; ciliary basal body-plasma membrane docking; regulation of G2/M transition of mitotic cell cycle; microtubule cytoskeleton organization; mitotic cell cycle
Sources:Amigo / QuickGO
Orthologs
Databases	NCBI: entry; OMA: entry
Species	Human	Mouse
Entrez	10383	227613
Ensembl	ENSG00000188229	ENSMUSG00000036752
UniProt	P68371	P68372
RefSeq (mRNA)	NM_006088	NM_146116
RefSeq (protein)	NP_006079	NP_666228
Location (UCSC)	Chr 9: 137.24 – 137.24 Mb	Chr 2: 25.11 – 25.11 Mb
PubMed search
- Wikidata
View/Edit Human	View/Edit Mouse

Tubulin beta-4B chain formerly known as tubulin beta-2C chain is a protein that in humans is encoded by the TUBB4B gene. It is thought that this protein could determine which hand is dominant in humans due to variations of the TUBB4B gene, which cause the protein to form microtubules that form cilia which direct fluids asymmetrically during development.
