= MAP4 =

Protein-coding gene in the species Homo sapiens

Identifiers
- Aliases: MAP4, microtubule associated protein 4
- External IDs: OMIM: 157132; MGI: 97178; GeneCards: MAP4

Gene location (Human)
Chr.	Chromosome 3 (human)
Band	3p21.31	Start	47,850,690 bp
Band	3p21.31	End	48,089,272 bp

Gene location (Mouse)
Chr.	Chromosome 9 (mouse)
Band	9 F2|9 59.83 cM	Start	109,931,460 bp
Band	9 F2|9 59.83 cM	End	110,083,955 bp
RNA expression pattern
Bgee	Human / Mouse (ortholog); Top expressed in: dorsal motor nucleus of vagus nerve; internal globus pallidus; inferior olivary nucleus; endothelial cell; optic nerve; tendon of biceps brachii; C1 segment; inferior ganglion of vagus nerve; ventral tegmental area; subthalamic nucleus / Top expressed in: neural layer of retina; blastocyst; muscle of thigh; dentate gyrus of hippocampal formation granule cell; morula; cerebellar cortex; mammillary body; dorsomedial hypothalamic nucleus; superior frontal gyrus; sciatic nerve; More reference expression data
BioGPS	n/a
Gene ontology
Molecular function	microtubule binding; structural molecule activity; tubulin binding; protein binding; RNA binding
Cellular component	microtubule associated complex; neuron projection; axoneme; mitotic spindle; microtubule; extracellular exosome; cytoskeleton; cytoplasm; postsynaptic density; cytosol; plasma membrane; microtubule cytoskeleton; axon
Biological process	mitotic spindle organization; microtubule sliding; cell division; negative regulation of non-motile cilium assembly; establishment of spindle orientation; neuron projection development; microtubule cytoskeleton organization
Sources:Amigo / QuickGO
Orthologs
Databases	NCBI: entry; OMA: entry
Species	Human	Mouse
Entrez	4134	17758
Ensembl	ENSG00000047849	ENSMUSG00000032479
UniProt	P27816	P27546
RefSeq (mRNA)	NM_001134364; NM_001134365; NM_002375; NM_030884; NM_030885	NM_001205330; NM_001205331; NM_001205332; NM_008633; NM_001311163 NM_001311164
RefSeq (protein)	NP_001127836; NP_002366; NP_112147	NP_001192259; NP_001192260; NP_001192261; NP_001298092; NP_001298093 NP_032659
Location (UCSC)	Chr 3: 47.85 – 48.09 Mb	Chr 9: 109.93 – 110.08 Mb
PubMed search
- Wikidata
View/Edit Human	View/Edit Mouse

Microtubule-associated protein 4 is a protein that in humans is encoded by the MAP4 gene.

The protein encoded by this gene is a major non-neuronal microtubule-associated protein. This protein contains a domain similar to the microtubule-binding domains of neuronal microtubule-associated protein (MAP2) and microtubule-associated protein tau (MAPT/TAU). This protein promotes microtubule assembly, and has been shown to counteract destabilization of interphase microtubule catastrophe promotion. Cyclin B was found to interact with this protein, which targets cell division cycle 2 (CDC2) kinase to microtubules. The phosphorylation of this protein affects microtubule properties and cell cycle progression. Multiple alternatively spliced transcript variants encoding distinct isoforms have been observed, the full-length nature of three of which are supported. uMAP4, the ubiquitous isoform of MAP4, functions in the architecture and positioning of the mitotic spindle in human cells. oMAP4 is predominantly expressed in brain and muscle and has been shown to organise microtubules into antiparallel bundles. mMAP4 is a muscle-specific isoform.
