= Tubulin beta-2A chain =

Protein-coding gene in the species Homo sapiens

TUBB2A
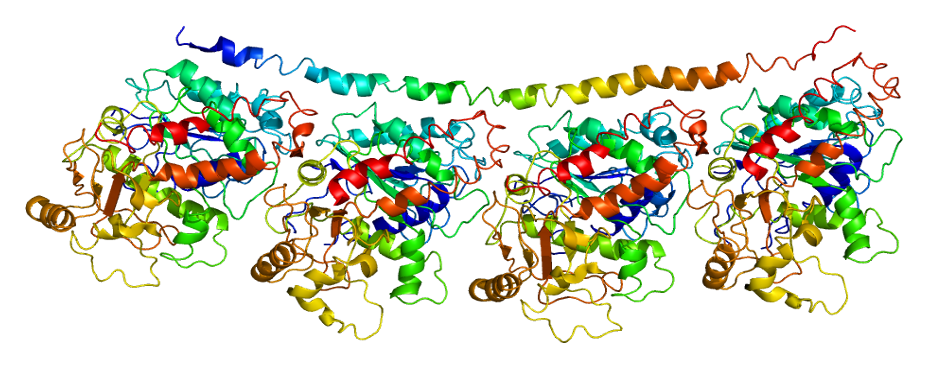

Identifiers
- Aliases: TUBB2A, CDCBM5, TUBB, TUBB2, dJ40E16.7, tubulin beta 2A class IIa
- External IDs: OMIM: 615101; MGI: 107861; GeneCards: TUBB2A

Gene location (Human)
Chr.	Chromosome 6 (human)
Band	6p25.2	Start	3,153,497 bp
Band	6p25.2	End	3,157,544 bp

Gene location (Mouse)
Chr.	Chromosome 13 (mouse)
Band	13 A3.3|13 14.03 cM	Start	34,258,257 bp
Band	13 A3.3|13 14.03 cM	End	34,261,990 bp
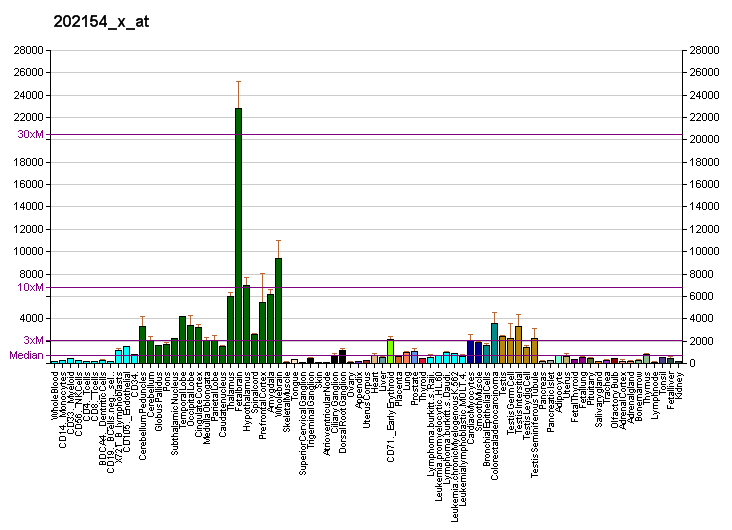

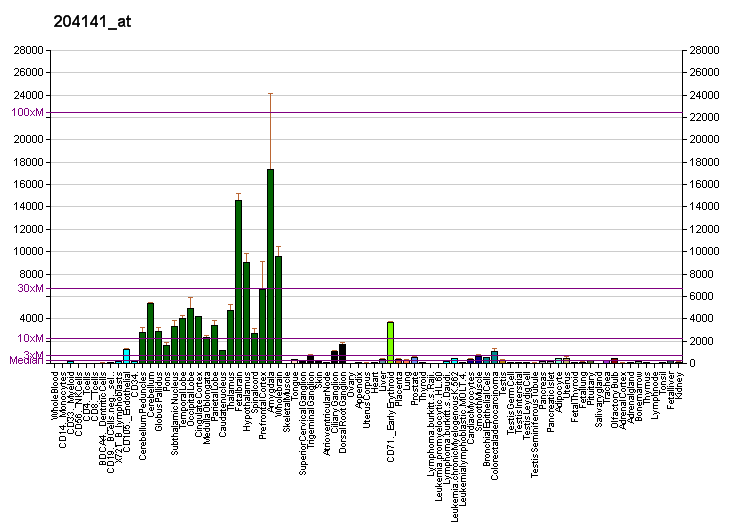
RNA expression pattern
Bgee	Human / Mouse (ortholog); Top expressed in: endothelial cell; pons; frontal pole; spinal ganglia; pars compacta; superior vestibular nucleus; Brodmann area 10; Brodmann area 23; orbitofrontal cortex; pars reticulata / Top expressed in: barrel cortex; trigeminal ganglion; piriform cortex; medial dorsal nucleus; anterior amygdaloid area; ventral tegmental area; supraoptic nucleus; ventromedial nucleus; lateral hypothalamus; subiculum; More reference expression data
BioGPS	More reference expression data
Gene ontology
Molecular function	nucleotide binding; GTP binding; structural constituent of cytoskeleton; protein binding; GTPase activity
Cellular component	cytoplasm; extracellular vesicle; microtubule; extracellular exosome; cytoskeleton; nucleus; microtubule cytoskeleton
Biological process	microtubule-based process; cytoskeleton organization; microtubule cytoskeleton organization; mitotic cell cycle
Sources:Amigo / QuickGO
Orthologs
Databases	NCBI: entry; OMA: entry
Species	Human	Mouse
Entrez	7280	22151
Ensembl	ENSG00000137267	ENSMUSG00000058672
UniProt	Q13885	Q7TMM9
RefSeq (mRNA)	NM_001310315; NM_001069	NM_009450
RefSeq (protein)	NP_001060; NP_001297244	NP_033476
Location (UCSC)	Chr 6: 3.15 – 3.16 Mb	Chr 13: 34.26 – 34.26 Mb
PubMed search
- Wikidata
View/Edit Human	View/Edit Mouse

Tubulin beta-2A chain is a protein that in humans is encoded by the TUBB2A gene.
