= Polyglutamylation =

Post-translational modification

Polyglutamylation is a form of reversible posttranslational modification of glutamate residues seen for example in alpha and beta tubulins, nucleosome assembly proteins NAP1 and NAP2. The γ-carboxy group of glutamate may form peptide-like bond with the amino group of a free glutamate whose α-carboxy group can now be extended into a polyglutamate chain. The glutamylation is done by the enzyme glutamylase and removed by deglutamylase.

Polyglutamylation of chain length of up to six occurs in certain glutamate residues near the C terminus of most major forms of tubulins. These residues, though themselves not involved in direct binding, cause conformational shifts that regulate binding of microtubule associated proteins (MAP and Tau) and motors.
