= Centrosome cycle =

Centrioles are nine triplets microtubules

Diagram of the centrosome cycle.

Centrosomes are the major microtubule organizing centers (MTOC) in mammalian cells. Failure of centrosome regulation can cause mistakes in chromosome segregation and is associated with aneuploidy. A centrosome is composed of two orthogonal cylindrical protein assemblies, called centrioles, which are surrounded by a protein dense amorphous cloud of pericentriolar material (PCM). The PCM is essential for nucleation and organization of microtubules. The centrosome cycle is important to ensure that daughter cells receive a centrosome after cell division. As the cell cycle progresses, the centrosome undergoes a series of morphological and functional changes. Initiation of the centrosome cycle occurs early in the cell cycle in order to have two centrosomes by the time mitosis occurs.

Since the centrosome organizes the microtubules of a cell, it has to do with the formation of the mitotic spindle, polarity and, therefore, cell shape, as well as all other processes having to do with the mitotic spindle. The centriole is the inner core of the centrosome, and its conformation is typically somewhat like that of spokes on a wheel. It has a somewhat different conformation amount different organisms, but its overall structure is similar. Plants, on the other hand, do not typically have centrioles.

The centrosome cycle consists of four phases that are synchronized to the cell cycle. These include: centrosome duplication during the G1 phase and S Phase, centrosome maturation in the G2 phase, centrosome separation in the mitotic phase, and centrosome disorientation in the late mitotic phase—G1 phase.

== Centriole synthesis ==
Centrioles are generated in new daughter cells through duplication of pre-existing centrioles in the mother cells. Each daughter cell inherits two centrioles (one centrosome) surrounded by pericentriolar material as a result of cell division. However, the two centrioles are of different ages. This is because one centriole originates from the mother cell while the other is replicated from the mother centriole during the cell cycle. It is possible to distinguish between the two preexisting centrioles because the mother and daughter centriole differ in both shape and function. For example, the mother centriole can nucleate and organize microtubules, whereas the daughter centriole can only nucleate.

First, procentrioles begin to form near each preexisting centriole as the cell moves from the G1 phase to the S phase. During S and G2 phases of the cell cycle, the procentrioles elongate until they reach the length of the older mother and daughter centrioles. At this point, the daughter centriole takes on the characteristics of a mother centriole. Once they reach full length, the new centriole and its mother centriole form a diplosome. A diplosome is a rigid complex formed by an orthogonal mother and newly formed centriole (now a daughter centriole) that aids in the processes of mitosis. As mitosis occurs, the distance between mother and daughter centriole increases until, congruent with anaphase, the diplosome breaks down and each centriole is surrounded by its own pericentriolar material.

== Centrosome duplication ==
Cell cycle regulation of centrosome duplication

Centrosomes are only supposed to replicate once in each cell cycle and are therefore highly regulated. The centrosome cycle has been found to be regulated by multiple things, including reversible phosphorylation and proteolysis. It also undergoes specific processes in each step of cell division due to the heavy regulation, which is why the process is so efficient.

Centrosome duplication is heavily regulated by cell cycle controls. This link between the cell cycle and the centrosome cycle is mediated by cyclin-dependent kinase 2 (Cdk2). Cdk2 is a protein kinase (an enzyme) known to regulate the cell cycle. There has been ample evidence that Cdk2 is necessary for both DNA replication and centrosome duplication, which are both key events in S phase. It has also been shown that Cdk2 complexes with both cyclin A and cyclin E and this complex is critical for centrosome duplication. Three Cdk2 substrates have been proposed to be responsible for regulation of centriole duplication: nucleophosmin (NPM/B23), CP110, and MPS1. Nucleophosmin is only found in unreplicated centrosomes and its phosphorylation by Cdk2/cyclin E removes NPM from the centrosomes, initiating procentriole formation. CP110 is an important centrosomal protein that is phosphorylated by both mitotic and interphase Cdk/cyclin complexes and is thought to influence centrosome duplication in the S phase. [19] MPS1 is a protein kinase that is essential to the spindle assembly checkpoint, and it is thought to possibly remodel an SAS6-cored intermediate between severed mother and daughter centrioles into a pair of cartwheel protein complexes onto which procentrioles assemble.

== Centrosome maturation ==
Centrosome maturation is defined as the increase or accumulation of γ-tubulin ring complexes and other PCM proteins at the centrosome. This increase in γ -tubulin gives the mature centrosome greater ability to nucleate microtubules. Phosphorylation plays a key regulatory role in centrosome maturation, and it is thought that Polo-like kinases (Plks) and Aurora kinases are responsible for this phosphorylation. [21] The phosphorylation of downstream targets of Plks and Aurora A lead to the recruitment of γ –tubulin and other proteins that form PCM around the centrioles. [23]

== Centrosome separation ==
In early mitosis, several motor proteins drive the separation of centrosomes. With the onset of prophase, the motor protein dynein provides the majority of the force required to pull the two centrosomes apart. The separation event actually occurs at the G2/M transition and happens in two steps. In the first step, the connection between the two parental centrioles is destroyed. In the second step, the centrosomes are separated via microtubule motor proteins.

== Centrosome disorientation ==
Centrosome disorientation refers to the loss of orthogonality between the mother and daughter centrioles. Once disorientation occurs, the mature centriole begins to move toward the cleave furrow. It has been proposed that this movement is a key step in abscission, the terminal phase of cell division.

== Centrosome reduction ==
Centrosome reduction is the gradual loss of centrosomal components that takes place after mitosis and during differentiation In cycling cells, after mitosis the centrosome has lost most of its pericentriolar material (PCM) and its microtubule nucleation capacity. In sperm, centriole structure is also changed in addition to the loss of PCM and its microtubule nucleation capacity.

== Dysregulation of the centrosome cycle ==
Improper progression through the centrosome cycle can lead to incorrect numbers of centrosomes and aneuploidy, which could eventually lead to cancer. The role of centrosomes in tumor progression is unclear. The mis-expression of genes such as p53, BRCA1, Mdm2, Aurora-A and survivin causes an increase in the amount of centrosomes present in a cell. However, it is not well understood how these genes influence the centrosome or how an increase in centrosomes influences tumor progression.

== The centrosome cycle and disease ==
Issues with the centrosome can have detrimental effects on the cell, which can lead to diseases in the organisms hosting the cells. Cancer is a heavily studied disease that has been found to have a relation to the cell's centrosome. Dwarfism, microcephaly, and ciliopathies have also recently been genetically linked to centrosome proteins.

Centrosomes are believed to be related to cancer due to the fact that they contain tumor suppressor proteins and oncogenes. These proteins have been found to cause detrimental alterations in the centrosome of various tumor cells. There are two main categories of the centrosome alteration: structural and functional. The structural changes can lead to different shapes, sizes, numbers, positions, or composition, while the functional changes can lead to issues with the microtubules and mitotic spindles, therefore becoming detrimental in cell division. Researchers are hopeful that the targeting of carious centrosomal proteins may be a possible treatment to or prevention of cancer.
