= Proximal centriole-like =

A proximal centriole-like (PCL) is an atypical type of centriole found in the sperm cells of insects. Its name refers to some similarity to the proximal centriole found in vertebrate sperm and the hypothesis that the two structures are homologous.

== Overview ==
The PCL is an atypical type of centriole because it lacks microtubules, a defining feature of centrioles. However, it is considered a type of centriole for several reasons. Its formation is dependent upon the same genetic pathway that mediates the initiation of centriole formation, it is composed of centriolar proteins, and it functions like a centriole after fertilization. Further, the PCL recruits pericentriolar material forming a centrosome that acts as a microtubule-organizing center and the PCL serves as a platform to form a typical centriole in the zygote (as expected from a centriole). Additionally, the PCL is essential to form one of the two spindle poles of the dividing zygote.

The PCL was discovered in flies. However, it is also found in beetles, suggesting that it is a common form of atypical centriole in insects.

== Similar structures in mammals ==
Another type of atypical type of centriole was discovered in human and bovine sperm. This is the distal centriole of the spermatozoon, which has atypical structure and composition. This spermatozoon distal centriole is composed of splayed microtubules surrounding previously undescribed rods of centriole luminal proteins, and it has only a subset of the protein found in a typical centriole. After fertilization, the atypical distal centriole that is attached to the sperm tail recruits pericentriolar material, forming a new centriole, and localizing to the spindle pole during mitosis.

During mammalian sperm swimming, the atypical distal centriole attached to the sperm tail helps couple the tail movement with head movement. The atypical distal centriole forms a dynamic basal complex together with other structures in the sperm neck (the proximal centriole and surrounding atypical pericentriolar matrix). The dynamic basal complex facilitates a cascade of internal sliding, coupling tail beating with head kinking. Altogether, the atypical distal centriole's properties suggest that it evolved into a transmission system that couples the sperm tail motors to the whole sperm, thereby enhancing sperm function.
