= Jadranka Lončarek =

Croatian cell and molecular biologist

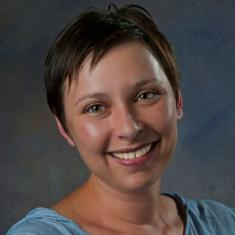
- Education: University of Zagreb (PhD)
- Scientific career
- Fields: Cell and molecular biology
- Workplaces: National Cancer Institute
- Thesis: The expression of the urokinase plasminogen activator gene in bladder carcinoma cell lines (2002)
- Doctoral advisor: Jasna Sorić

Jadranka Lončarek is a Croatian cell and molecular biologist researching the molecular mechanism of centrosome biogenesis and their function, with particular attention on numerical control of centrosome formation in non-transformed and cancerous human cells.

== Education ==
Lončarek earned a Ph.D. in cell and molecular biology at the Faculty of Science, University of Zagreb. Her dissertation in 2002 was titled The expression of the urokinase plasminogen activator gene in bladder carcinoma cell lines. Her doctoral advisor was Jasna Sorić.

She completed postdoctoral research in the laboratory of Alexey Khodjakov at the Wadsworth Center, where she studied the mechanisms of centriole duplication and mitotic spindle formation.

== Career and research ==
Lončarek joined the National Institutes of Health in 2011 as a Stadtman investigator at the National Cancer Institute. She studies the centrosome cycle in proliferating cells and is head of the Centrosome Biology Section of the Cancer Innovation Laboratory. Lončarek received tenure from NIH in 2020.

Lončarek researches the molecular mechanism of centrosome biogenesis and their function. She studies the architecture and cellular processes associated with their activity. Lončarek aims to unravel the cellular regulatory pathways that control a centrosome number in normal and pathological conditions such as human tumors. Her laboratory uses biochemical and genetic approaches and combines them with conventional and super resolution microscopy and electron microscopy.
