= TUBGCP4 =

Protein-coding gene in the species Homo sapiens

Identifiers
- Aliases: TUBGCP4, 76P, GCP-4, GCP4, Grip76, MCCRP3, tubulin gamma complex associated protein 4
- External IDs: OMIM: 609610; MGI: 1196293; GeneCards: TUBGCP4
Available structures
PDB	Ortholog search: PDBe RCSB
PDB	List of PDB id codes 3RIP

Gene location (Human)
Chr.	Chromosome 15 (human)
Band	15q15.3	Start	43,369,221 bp
Band	15q15.3	End	43,409,771 bp

Gene location (Mouse)
Chr.	Chromosome 2 (mouse)
Band	2 E5|2 60.37 cM	Start	121,001,135 bp
Band	2 E5|2 60.37 cM	End	121,029,251 bp
RNA expression pattern
Bgee	Human / Mouse (ortholog); Top expressed in: sperm; secondary oocyte; buccal mucosa cell; ganglionic eminence; ventricular zone; gonad; testicle; tibialis anterior muscle; epithelium of colon; cerebellar hemisphere / Top expressed in: ascending aorta; spermatocyte; tail of embryo; genital tubercle; aortic valve; supraoptic nucleus; neural layer of retina; internal carotid artery; thymus; spermatid; More reference expression data
BioGPS	n/a
Gene ontology
Molecular function	structural constituent of cytoskeleton; microtubule minus-end binding; protein binding; gamma-tubulin binding
Cellular component	cytoplasm; microtubule organizing center; gamma-tubulin complex; cytosol; spindle pole body; spindle pole; recycling endosome; equatorial microtubule organizing center; membrane; microtubule; microtubule cytoskeleton; cytoskeleton; centrosome
Biological process	microtubule nucleation by interphase microtubule organizing center; microtubule cytoskeleton organization; mitotic spindle assembly; centrosome duplication; cytoplasmic microtubule organization; microtubule nucleation; meiosis; mitotic cell cycle; spindle assembly; protein-containing complex assembly
Sources:Amigo / QuickGO
Orthologs
Databases	NCBI: entry; OMA: entry
Species	Human	Mouse
Entrez	27229	51885
Ensembl	ENSG00000137822	ENSMUSG00000027263
UniProt	Q9UGJ1	Q9D4F8
RefSeq (mRNA)	NM_001286414; NM_014444	NM_001290824; NM_153387
RefSeq (protein)	NP_001273343; NP_055259	NP_001277753; NP_700436
Location (UCSC)	Chr 15: 43.37 – 43.41 Mb	Chr 2: 121 – 121.03 Mb
PubMed search
- Wikidata
View/Edit Human	View/Edit Mouse

Tubulin, gamma complex associated protein 4 is a protein in humans that is encoded by the TUBGCP4 gene. It is part of the gamma tubulin complex, which required for microtubule nucleation at the centrosome.

== See also ==
- Tubulin
- TUBGCP2
- TUBGCP3
- TUBGCP5
- TUBGCP6
