= TUBGCP6 =

Protein-coding gene in the species Homo sapiens

Identifiers
- Aliases: TUBGCP6, GCP-6, GCP6, MCCRP, MCPHCR, MCCRP1, tubulin gamma complex associated protein 6
- External IDs: OMIM: 610053; MGI: 2146071; GeneCards: TUBGCP6

Gene location (Human)
Chr.	Chromosome 22 (human)
Band	22q13.33	Start	50,217,689 bp
Band	22q13.33	End	50,245,023 bp

Gene location (Mouse)
Chr.	Chromosome 15 (mouse)
Band	15|15 E3	Start	88,982,560 bp
Band	15|15 E3	End	89,007,315 bp
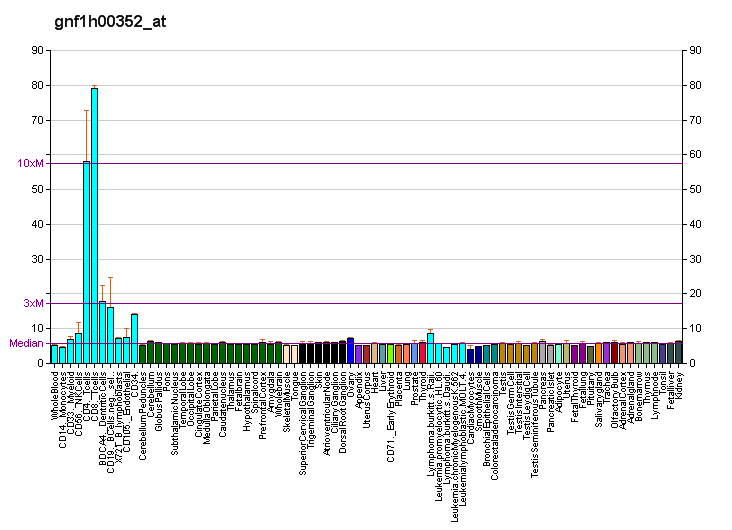
RNA expression pattern
Bgee	Human / Mouse (ortholog); Top expressed in: right hemisphere of cerebellum; anterior pituitary; right lobe of thyroid gland; left lobe of thyroid gland; body of pancreas; granulocyte; sural nerve; right frontal lobe; right ovary; apex of heart / Top expressed in: tail of embryo; genital tubercle; otic vesicle; granulocyte; ventricular zone; cerebellar cortex; superior frontal gyrus; yolk sac; spermatocyte; dentate gyrus of hippocampal formation granule cell; More reference expression data
BioGPS	More reference expression data
Gene ontology
Molecular function	microtubule binding; structural constituent of cytoskeleton; microtubule minus-end binding; gamma-tubulin binding
Cellular component	cytoplasm; cytosol; centrosome; spindle pole; equatorial microtubule organizing center; membrane; microtubule organizing center; spindle pole body; microtubule; extracellular exosome; cytoskeleton; gamma-tubulin complex; gamma-tubulin small complex
Biological process	centrosome duplication; microtubule nucleation by interphase microtubule organizing center; mitotic spindle assembly; cytoplasmic microtubule organization; microtubule cytoskeleton organization; microtubule nucleation; meiosis; mitotic cell cycle; spindle assembly
Sources:Amigo / QuickGO
Orthologs
Databases	NCBI: entry; OMA: entry
Species	Human	Mouse
Entrez	85378	328580
Ensembl	ENSG00000128159	ENSMUSG00000051786
UniProt	Q96RT7	G5E8P0
RefSeq (mRNA)	NM_001008658; NM_020461	NM_001163319
RefSeq (protein)	NP_065194	NP_001156791
Location (UCSC)	Chr 22: 50.22 – 50.25 Mb	Chr 15: 88.98 – 89.01 Mb
PubMed search
- Wikidata
View/Edit Human	View/Edit Mouse

Gamma-tubulin complex component 6 is a protein that in humans is encoded by the TUBGCP6 gene. It is part of the gamma tubulin complex, which required for microtubule nucleation at the centrosome.

== See also ==
- Tubulin
- TUBGCP2
- TUBGCP3
- TUBGCP4
- TUBGCP5
