= TUBGCP2 =

Protein-coding gene in the species Homo sapiens

Identifiers
- Aliases: TUBGCP2, GCP-2, GCP2, Grip103, SPBC97, Spc97p, h103p, hGCP2, hSpc97, tubulin gamma complex associated protein 2, ALP4, SPC97, PAMDDFS
- External IDs: OMIM: 617817; MGI: 1921487; GeneCards: TUBGCP2

Gene location (Human)
Chr.	Chromosome 10 (human)
Band	10q26.3	Start	133,278,635 bp
Band	10q26.3	End	133,318,823 bp

Gene location (Mouse)
Chr.	Chromosome 7 (mouse)
Band	7|7 F4	Start	139,575,868 bp
Band	7|7 F4	End	139,616,582 bp
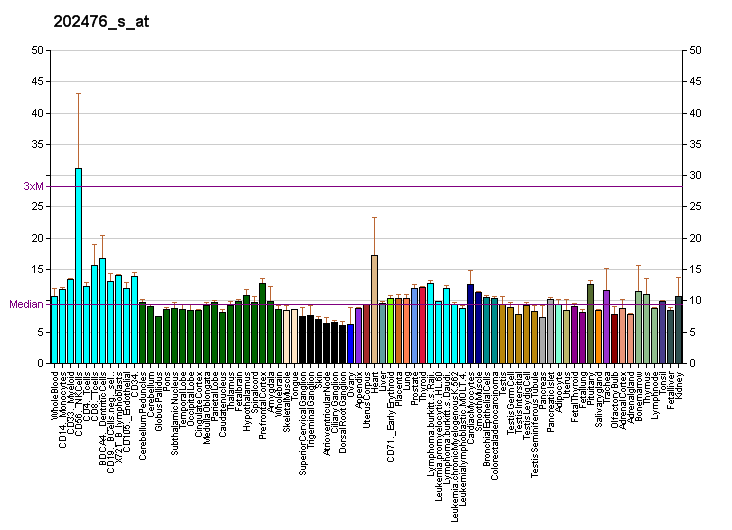

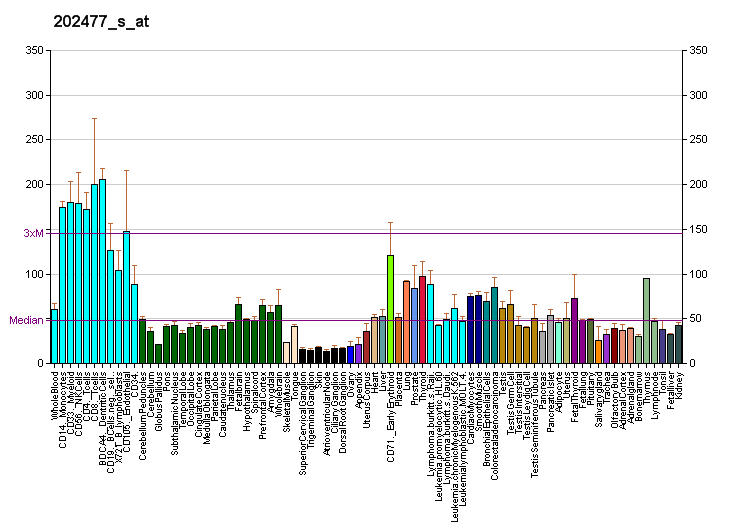
RNA expression pattern
Bgee	Human / Mouse (ortholog); Top expressed in: right uterine tube; olfactory zone of nasal mucosa; gonad; skin of leg; skin of abdomen; mucosa of transverse colon; anterior pituitary; granulocyte; right ovary; left ovary / Top expressed in: spermatocyte; seminiferous tubule; maxillary prominence; mandibular prominence; spermatid; somite; efferent ductule; Gonadal ridge; autopod region; hand; More reference expression data
BioGPS	More reference expression data
Gene ontology
Molecular function	structural constituent of cytoskeleton; protein binding; microtubule minus-end binding; gamma-tubulin binding
Cellular component	cytoplasm; cytosol; centrosome; spindle pole; equatorial microtubule organizing center; membrane; nucleoplasm; microtubule organizing center; gamma-tubulin small complex; spindle pole body; cytoplasmic microtubule; cytoskeleton; microtubule; gamma-tubulin complex
Biological process	centrosome duplication; microtubule nucleation by interphase microtubule organizing center; mitotic spindle assembly; cytoplasmic microtubule organization; microtubule cytoskeleton organization; microtubule nucleation; meiosis; mitotic cell cycle; spindle assembly; protein-containing complex assembly
Sources:Amigo / QuickGO
Orthologs
Databases	NCBI: entry; OMA: entry
Species	Human	Mouse
Entrez	10844	74237
Ensembl	ENSG00000130640	ENSMUSG00000025474
UniProt	Q9BSJ2	Q921G8
RefSeq (mRNA)	NM_001256617; NM_001256618; NM_006659	NM_001286007; NM_001286009; NM_001286011; NM_133755
RefSeq (protein)	NP_001243546; NP_001243547; NP_006650	NP_001272936; NP_001272938; NP_001272940; NP_598516
Location (UCSC)	Chr 10: 133.28 – 133.32 Mb	Chr 7: 139.58 – 139.62 Mb
PubMed search
- Wikidata
View/Edit Human	View/Edit Mouse

Gamma-tubulin complex component 2 is a protein that in humans is encoded by the TUBGCP2 gene. It is part of the gamma-tubulin complex, which is required for microtubule nucleation at the centrosome.

== See also ==
- Tubulin
- TUBGCP3
- TUBGCP4
- TUBGCP5
- TUBGCP6
