= TUBGCP3 =

Protein-coding gene in the species Homo sapiens

Identifiers
- Aliases: TUBGCP3, 104p, GCP3, Grip104, SPBC98, Spc98, Spc98p, tubulin gamma complex associated protein 3, ALP6
- External IDs: OMIM: 617818; MGI: 2183752; GeneCards: TUBGCP3

Gene location (Human)
Chr.	Chromosome 13 (human)
Band	13q34	Start	112,485,011 bp
Band	13q34	End	112,588,205 bp

Gene location (Mouse)
Chr.	Chromosome 8 (mouse)
Band	8|8 A1.1	Start	12,664,277 bp
Band	8|8 A1.1	End	12,722,248 bp
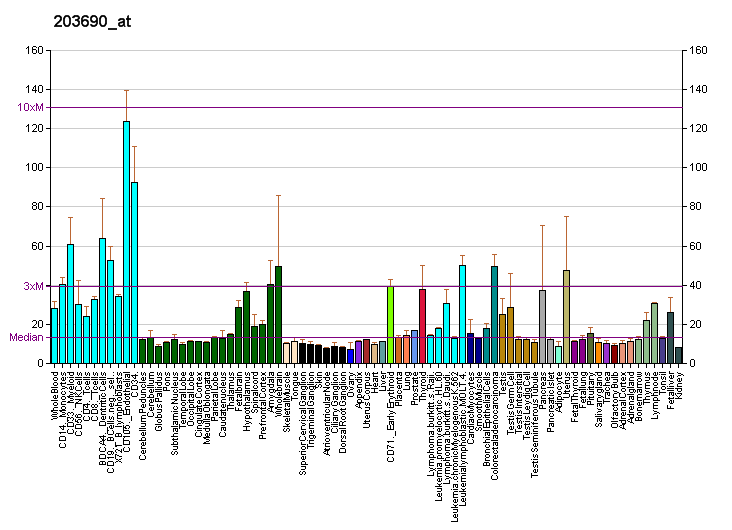

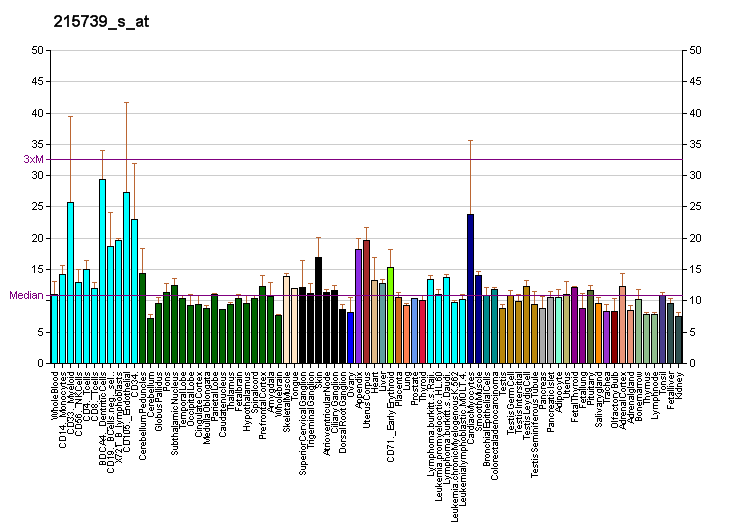

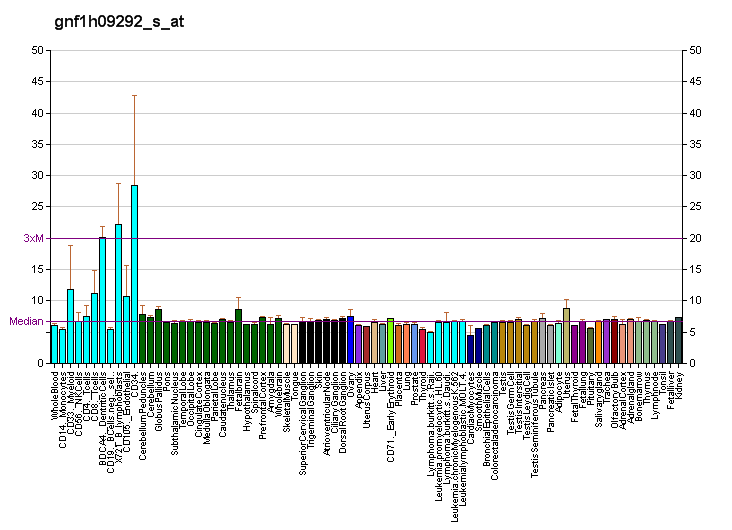
RNA expression pattern
Bgee	Human / Mouse (ortholog); Top expressed in: monocyte; ventricular zone; bone marrow cell; ganglionic eminence; right ovary; left ovary; gastric mucosa; gonad; testicle; body of uterus / Top expressed in: Ileal epithelium; tail of embryo; ventricular zone; genital tubercle; thymus; Gonadal ridge; neural layer of retina; cerebellar cortex; granulocyte; superior frontal gyrus; More reference expression data
BioGPS	More reference expression data
Gene ontology
Molecular function	structural molecule activity; structural constituent of cytoskeleton; protein binding; microtubule minus-end binding; gamma-tubulin binding
Cellular component	cytoplasm; cytosol; centrosome; spindle pole; equatorial microtubule organizing center; membrane; spindle; microtubule organizing center; gamma-tubulin small complex; polar microtubule; spindle pole body; centriole; cytoskeleton; microtubule; gamma-tubulin complex
Biological process	centrosome duplication; microtubule nucleation by interphase microtubule organizing center; single fertilization; mitotic spindle assembly; cytoplasmic microtubule organization; microtubule cytoskeleton organization; microtubule nucleation; meiosis; mitotic cell cycle; spindle assembly
Sources:Amigo / QuickGO
Orthologs
Databases	NCBI: entry; OMA: entry
Species	Human	Mouse
Entrez	10426	259279
Ensembl	ENSG00000282003; ENSG00000126216	ENSMUSG00000000759
UniProt	Q96CW5	P58854
RefSeq (mRNA)	NM_001286277; NM_001286278; NM_001286279; NM_006322	NM_198031
RefSeq (protein)	NP_001273206; NP_001273207; NP_001273208; NP_006313	NP_932148
Location (UCSC)	Chr 13: 112.49 – 112.59 Mb	Chr 8: 12.66 – 12.72 Mb
PubMed search
- Wikidata
View/Edit Human	View/Edit Mouse

Gamma-tubulin complex component 3 is a protein that in humans is encoded by the TUBGCP3 gene. It is part of the gamma tubulin complex, which required for microtubule nucleation at the centrosome.

== See also ==
- Tubulin
- TUBGCP2
- TUBGCP4
- TUBGCP5
- TUBGCP6
