= TUBGCP5 =

Protein-coding gene in the species Homo sapiens

Identifiers
- Aliases: TUBGCP5, GCP5, tubulin gamma complex associated protein 5
- External IDs: OMIM: 608147; MGI: 2178836; GeneCards: TUBGCP5

Gene location (Human)
Chr.	Chromosome 15 (human)
Band	15q11.2	Start	22,983,192 bp
Band	15q11.2	End	23,039,572 bp

Gene location (Mouse)
Chr.	Chromosome 7 (mouse)
Band	7|7 B5	Start	55,443,902 bp
Band	7|7 B5	End	55,481,425 bp
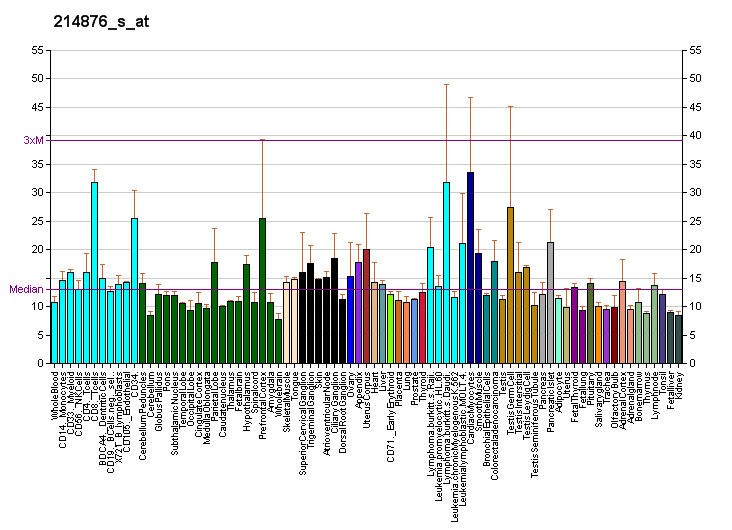
RNA expression pattern
Bgee	Human / Mouse (ortholog); Top expressed in: sural nerve; Achilles tendon; testicle; corpus callosum; gonad; endometrium; body of pancreas; tonsil; canal of the cervix; smooth muscle tissue / Top expressed in: spermatocyte; ascending aorta; aortic valve; tail of embryo; genital tubercle; neural layer of retina; superior cervical ganglion; Rostral migratory stream; ventricular zone; facial motor nucleus; More reference expression data
BioGPS	More reference expression data
Gene ontology
Molecular function	microtubule binding; structural constituent of cytoskeleton; microtubule minus-end binding; gamma-tubulin binding
Cellular component	centrosome; spindle pole; equatorial microtubule organizing center; microtubule organizing center; spindle pole body; microtubule; cytoskeleton; cytoplasm; cytosol; gamma-tubulin complex
Biological process	centrosome duplication; microtubule nucleation by interphase microtubule organizing center; mitotic spindle assembly; cytoplasmic microtubule organization; microtubule cytoskeleton organization; microtubule nucleation; meiosis; mitotic cell cycle; spindle assembly
Sources:Amigo / QuickGO
Orthologs
Databases	NCBI: entry; OMA: entry
Species	Human	Mouse
Entrez	114791	233276
Ensembl	ENSG00000276856; ENSG00000275835; ENSG00000280807	ENSMUSG00000033790
UniProt	Q96RT8	Q8BKN5
RefSeq (mRNA)	NM_001102610; NM_052903; NM_001354372; NM_001354373; NM_001354374 NM_001354375; NM_001354376; NM_001354377; NM_001354378	NM_146190; NM_001360873; NM_001360874
RefSeq (protein)	NP_001096080; NP_443135; NP_001341301; NP_001341302; NP_001341303 NP_001341304; NP_001341305; NP_001341306; NP_001341307	NP_666302; NP_001347802; NP_001347803
Location (UCSC)	Chr 15: 22.98 – 23.04 Mb	Chr 7: 55.44 – 55.48 Mb
PubMed search
- Wikidata
View/Edit Human	View/Edit Mouse

Gamma-tubulin complex component 5 is a protein that in humans is encoded by the TUBGCP5 gene. It is part of the gamma tubulin complex, which required for microtubule nucleation at the centrosome.

== See also ==
- Tubulin
- TUBGCP2
- TUBGCP3
- TUBGCP4
- TUBGCP6
