= SASS6 =

Protein-coding gene in humans

Identifiers
- Aliases: SASS6, SAS-6, SAS6, MCPH14, SAS-6 centriolar assembly protein
- External IDs: OMIM: 609321; MGI: 1920026; GeneCards: SASS6

Gene location (Human)
Chr.	Chromosome 1 (human)
Band	1p21.2	Start	100,083,563 bp
Band	1p21.2	End	100,132,955 bp

Gene location (Mouse)
Chr.	Chromosome 3 (mouse)
Band	3|3 G1	Start	116,388,631 bp
Band	3|3 G1	End	116,424,653 bp
RNA expression pattern
Bgee	Human / Mouse (ortholog); Top expressed in: oocyte; secondary oocyte; testicle; gonad; ventricular zone; ganglionic eminence; Achilles tendon; endothelial cell; rectum; appendix / Top expressed in: spermatid; spermatocyte; genital tubercle; tail of embryo; Paneth cell; seminiferous tubule; ventricular zone; gray matter layer of cerebellum; granulocyte; maxillary prominence; More reference expression data
BioGPS	n/a
Gene ontology
Molecular function	protein binding
Cellular component	cytoplasm; centriole; cytoskeleton; deuterosome; microtubule organizing center; cytosol; centrosome
Biological process	cell cycle; centriole replication; centrosome duplication
Sources:Amigo / QuickGO
Orthologs
Databases	NCBI: entry; OMA: entry
Species	Human	Mouse
Entrez	163786	72776
Ensembl	ENSG00000156876	ENSMUSG00000027959
UniProt	Q6UVJ0	Q80UK7
RefSeq (mRNA)	NM_194292; NM_001304829	NM_001289568; NM_001289571; NM_028349
RefSeq (protein)	NP_001291758; NP_919268	NP_001276497; NP_001276500; NP_082625
Location (UCSC)	Chr 1: 100.08 – 100.13 Mb	Chr 3: 116.39 – 116.42 Mb
PubMed search
- Wikidata
View/Edit Human	View/Edit Mouse

Spindle assembly abnormal protein 6 homolog (SAS-6) is a protein that in humans is encoded by the SASS6 gene.

== Function ==
SAS-6 is necessary for centrosome duplication and functions during procentriole formation; SAS-6 functions to ensure that each centriole seeds the formation of a single procentriole per cell cycle.

== Clinical significance ==
Mutations in SASS6 are associated to MCPH.
