= Jadran =

Jadran means the Adriatic Sea in Serbo-Croatian and Slovene. It may also refer to:

== People ==
- Jadran Radovčić (born 1959), Croatian rower
- Jadran Barut (born 1940), Slovenian rower
- Jadran Vujačić (born 1959), Montenegrin basketball player and coach

== Ships ==
- Jadran (ship) (built 1931), a former Yugoslav ship now a Montenegrin Navy training ship
- MS Jadran (built 1957), a former passenger ship, converted into Captain John's Harbour Boat Restaurant
- MV Jadran (built 2012), a ferry operated by Croatian shipping company Jadrolinija

== Sports ==
- NK Jadran Dekani, a Slovenian association football club
- NK Jadran Poreč, a Croatian association football club
- NK Jadran Kaštel Sućurac, a football club in Croatia
- NK Jadran Luka Ploče, a football club in Croatia
- PVK Jadran, a water polo club from Herceg Novi, Montenegro

== Other ==
- Jadran Film, a Croatian film company
- TV Jadran, a Croatian television station
- Koser KB-3 Jadran, a Yugoslavian sailplane
- Jadran or Zadran tribe, a Pashtun tribe
- Jadran (cigarette), a Croatian brand of cigarettes manufactured by Adris Grupa
- Jordan Maron a YouTuber, often nicknamed Jadran

== See also ==
- Jadranko, masculine given name often shortened to Jadran
- Jadranka, female counterpart to Jadranko
