= Cenex (disambiguation) =

Cenex is a UK agency promoting low-carbon transport technologies

Cenex may also refer to:

- Cenex, brand fuel and convenience stores owned by CHS, Inc.
- Cenex, a brand of latex

== See also ==
- Senex (disambiguation)
- ODF2, or cenexin, a protein
- Cinex, a Venezuelan cinema chain
