= CNTROB =

Protein-coding gene in the species Homo sapiens

Identifiers
- Aliases: CNTROB, LIP8, PP1221, centrobin, centriole duplication and spindle assembly protein
- External IDs: OMIM: 611425; MGI: 2443290; GeneCards: CNTROB

Gene location (Human)
| Chr. | Chromosome 17 (human) |
| Band | 17p13.1 | Start | 7,932,101 bp |
| Band | 17p13.1 | End | 7,949,920 bp |

Gene location (Mouse)
| Chr. | Chromosome 11 (mouse) |
| Band | 11|11 B3 | Start | 69,299,487 bp |
| Band | 11|11 B3 | End | 69,323,775 bp |
RNA expression pattern
| Bgee | Human / Mouse (ortholog); Top expressed in: left testis; right testis; ventricular zone; body of uterus; ganglionic eminence; right lung; upper lobe of left lung; pancreatic ductal cell; canal of the cervix; cardiac muscle tissue of right atrium / Top expressed in: superior surface of tongue; gallbladder; ventricular zone; otic vesicle; neural layer of retina; secondary oocyte; spermatocyte; zygote; thymus; primary oocyte; More reference expression data |
| BioGPS | n/a |
Gene ontology
| Molecular function | protein binding; protein domain specific binding |
| Cellular component | centriole; centrosome; cytoskeleton; cytoplasm; cytosol |
| Biological process | cell cycle; mitotic cytokinetic process; centrosome separation; cell division; centriole replication; regulation of cilium assembly |
Sources:Amigo / QuickGO
Orthologs
| Databases | NCBI: entry; OMA: entry |
| Species | Human | Mouse |
| Entrez | 116840 | 216846 |
| Ensembl | ENSG00000170037 | ENSMUSG00000032782 |
| UniProt | Q8N137 | Q8CB62 |
| RefSeq (mRNA) | NM_001037144; NM_053051; NM_001330124; NM_001353202; NM_001353203 NM_001353204; NM_001353205; NM_001353206; NM_001353207; NM_001353208; NM_001353209 | NM_172560 |
| RefSeq (protein) | NP_001032221; NP_001317053; NP_444279; NP_001340131; NP_001340132 NP_001340133; NP_001340134; NP_001340135; NP_001340136; NP_001340137; NP_001340138 | NP_766148 |
| Location (UCSC) | Chr 17: 7.93 – 7.95 Mb | Chr 11: 69.3 – 69.32 Mb |
| PubMed search |
- Wikidata
| View/Edit Human | View/Edit Mouse |

Centrobin is a protein that in humans is encoded by the CNTROB gene. It is a centriole-associated protein that asymmetrically localizes to the daughter centriole, and is required for centriole duplication and cytokinesis.
