= Centrin =

Family of calcium-binding phosphoproteins

Caltractin
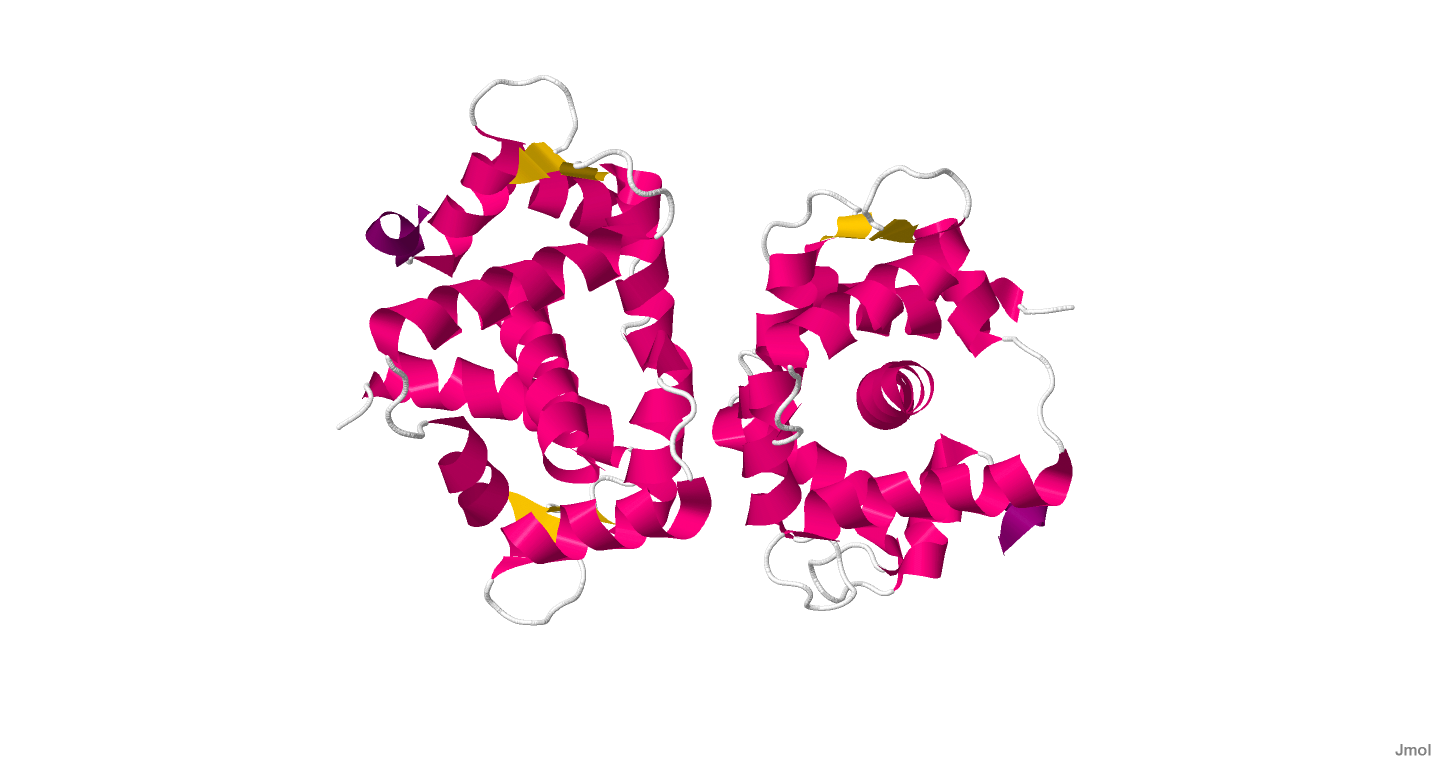
- Crystal structure of the SdCen/skMLCK complex.

Identifiers
- Organism: Scherffelia dubia
- Symbol: caltractin
- Orthologs: OMA: entry
- RefSeq (mRNA): X69220
- UniProt: Q06827
Search for
- Structures: Swiss-model
- Domains: InterPro

Centrins, also known as caltractins, are a family of calcium-binding phosphoproteins found in the centrosome of eukaryotes. Centrins are small calcium binding proteins that are ubiquitous centrosome components. There are about 350 "signature" proteins that are unique to eukaryotic cells but have no significant homology to proteins in archaea and bacteria. They are a type of protein that is essential and present in almost all eukaryotic cells and are found in the centrioles and pericentriolar lattice. Human centrin genes are CETN1, CETN2 and CETN3^{.}

Humans and mice have three centrin genes: Cetn-1, which is typically only expressed in male germ cells, and Cetn-2 and Cetn-3, which are typically only expressed in somatic cells. Centrin-2 is a recombinant GFP-centrin-2 and centriole protein that localizes to centrioles throughout the cell cycle, while centrin-3 seems to stick to the pericentriolar material that surrounds the centrioles.

== History ==
Centrin was first isolated and characterized from the flagellar roots of the green alga Tetraselmis striata in 1984. Jeffrey Salisbury, who discovered centrin in the green algae, and his colleagues used RNA interference (RNAi) to reduce the levels of centrin-2 in human tissue culture cells. The RNAi of centrin-2 from HeLa cells had led to progressive losses in the centrioles and was consistent with full blocks in the centriole replication. He had proved that centrin was involved in centriole duplication in animal cells like seen in his previous work with algae. This implies that centrin requirement was absolute for plants and animals within the centriole.

== Function ==
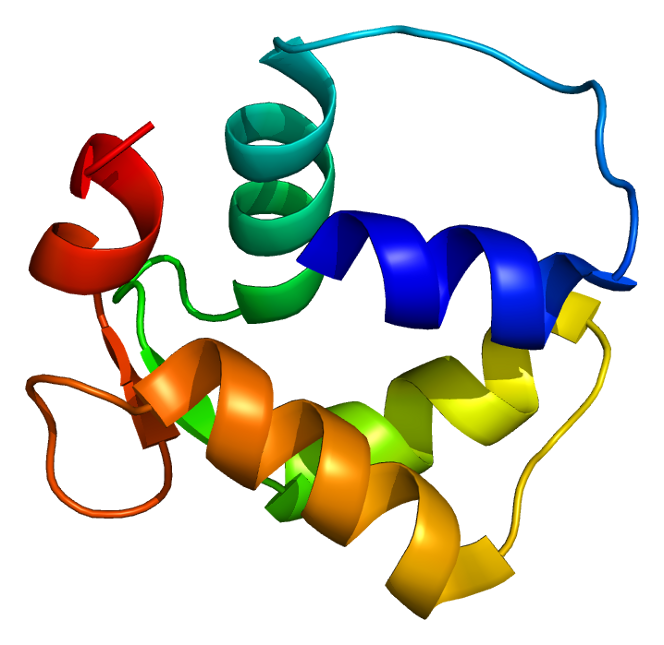
Cetn2 which is expressed within somatic cells

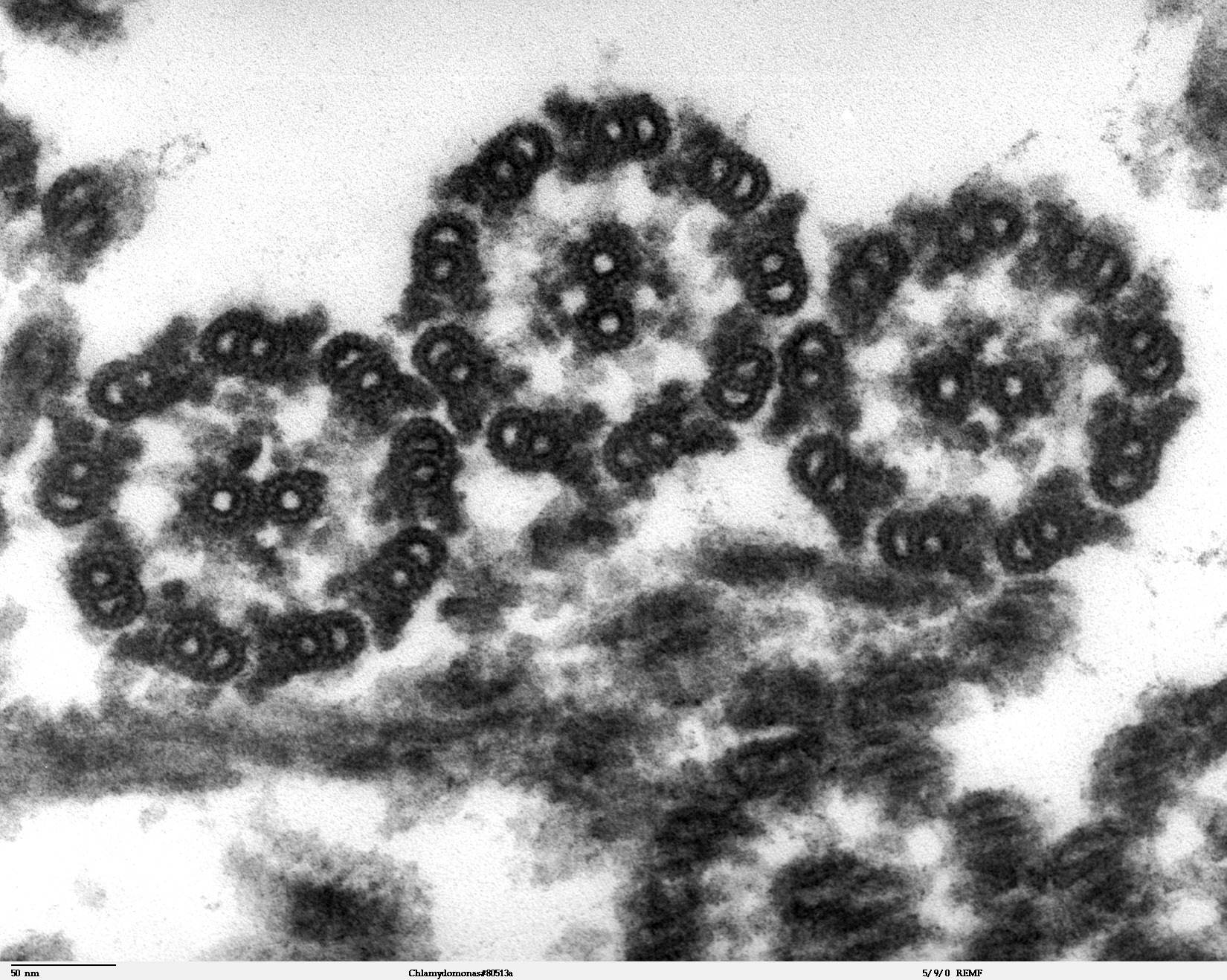
Centrin containing fibers presented in this electron micrograph of Chlamydomonas centrioles

Centrins are required for duplication of centrioles. They may also play a role in severing of microtubules by causing calcium-mediated contraction. It was found that centrin was essential within the calcium channel metabolism and it has a high affinity for calcium and a way lower affinity for phosphorus and other cell mineral constituents. Centrins show calcium-sensitive contractile behavior and was identified before as a calcium sensing regulator of the centriole structure. It is one of the first proteins to localize at sites of newly forming centrioles in semiconservative and novo assembly pathways. In algae, ciliates, and lower land plants failure of centrioles to duplicate is shown when a mutation, deletion, or knockdown of centrin happens by RNAi because centrin is a key factor for the structural integrity of centrioles.

Studies of experimental ablation of centrin synthesis in alga Chlamydomonas cryptogamous water fern Marsilea indicate a key role of centrin having to do with centriole biogenesis.

Centrins facilitated the duplication of centrioles and the severing of microtubules by calcium mediated contraction. The centrin found was highly concentrated outside of the centrosome and a lot of it was found to be non-centrosomal, which assembled during meiosis two. The extra-centrosomal materials function is not yet fully understood by researchers yet but using cross linking found centrin does have an affinity for actin and the terminal portion of the HC. Immunoprecipitation assays are needed in order to confirm this.

== Structure ==
Centrin belongs to the EF-hand superfamily of calcium-binding proteins and has four calcium-binding EF-hands. It has a molecular weight of 20 kDa.

Centrins contain four helix-loop-helix features specifically made binding with calcium in the transitional region of the axoneme. The axoneme is the bridge between the nucleus and the basal body where the proximal and distal fibers are connecting two basal bodies. Centrin is also present in the set of fibers that connect the microtubule blades.

Studies of higher eukaryotic cells such as human cells proved that centrins are the universal centrosome protein that occurs in fibers linking centrioles to one another and the distal most core structure called the "transition zone".

== See also ==
- Centriole
- Centrosome
