= Diplosome =

Figure1. Illustrates the movement of a diplosome in the early stages of mitosis as described in Diplosome in Mitosis.

In cell biology, a diplosome refers to the pair of centrioles which are arranged perpendicularly to one another located near the nucleus. The diplosome plays a role in many processes such as in primary cilium development, spermiogenesis of teleosts, and mitosis. The rigid arrangement of centrioles in a diplosome is generally established after the procentriole is formed during mitosis.

== Role of Diplosome in Primary Cilia Development ==
Primary cilia develop from the diplosome. Although the mechanism is not defined, during prometaphase of mitosis the diplosome undergoes many changes to allow cilium resorption to occur.

== Role of Diplosome in Spermiogenesis of teleosts ==
The type of spermiogenesis the teleost will undergo is dependent on the location of the diplosome on the nucleus, which ultimately acts as the cause of where the flagellum will be. In type I spermiogenesis, the diplosome is located at a lateral position on the nucleus leading to a perpendicular flagellum to the nucleus. In type II spermiogenesis, the diplosome is located at the apical pole of the nucleus, creating a parallel flagellum to the nucleus. In both scenarios the diplosome will reach the nuclear fossa after nuclear rotation.

== Diplosome in Mitosis ==
Diplosomes first appear during G2 phase of the cell cycle. In the early stages of mitosis the diplosome will split and begin to move in opposite directions until both reach edges of the nucleus. At this point one diplosome will return to the center of the nucleus while the other continues over the edge moving toward the center on the opposite side of the nucleus. The separated diplosome will stay in place until the nuclear envelope has broken.
