= TUBG1 =

Tubulin protein

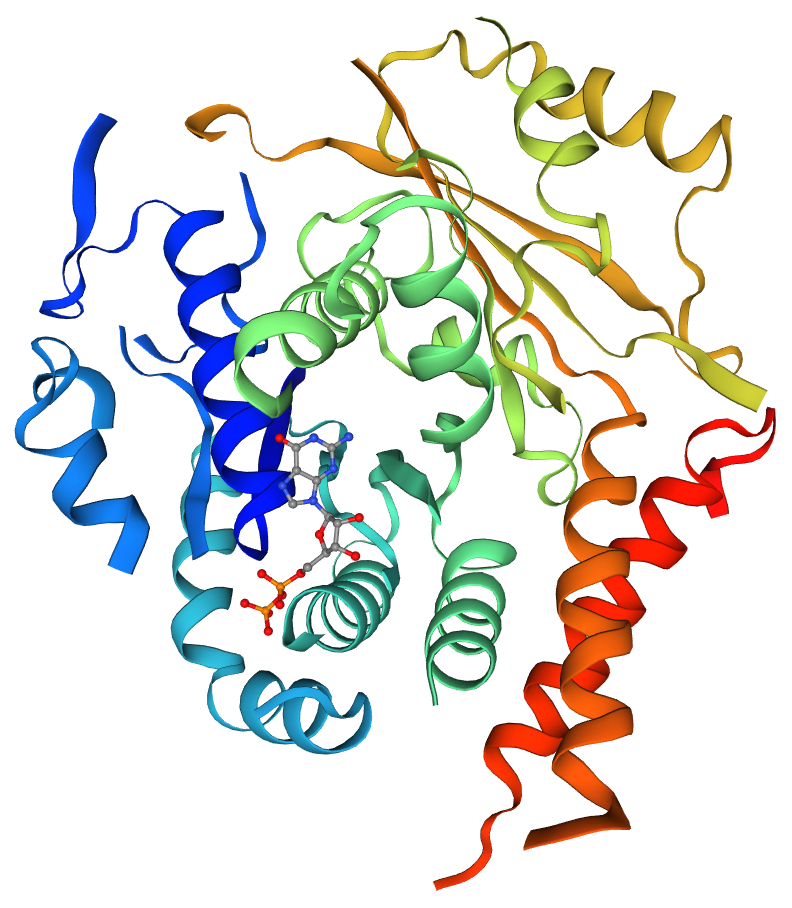

Identifiers
- Aliases: TUBG1, CDCBM4, GCP-1, TUBG, TUBGCP1, tubulin gamma 1
- External IDs: OMIM: 191135; MGI: 101834; GeneCards: TUBG1
Available structures
PDB	Ortholog search: PDBe RCSB
PDB	List of PDB id codes 1Z5V, 1Z5W, 3CB2

Gene location (Human)
Chr.	Chromosome 17 (human)
Band	17q21.2	Start	42,609,641 bp
Band	17q21.2	End	42,615,238 bp

Gene location (Mouse)
Chr.	Chromosome 11 (mouse)
Band	11 D|11 64.24 cM	Start	101,010,764 bp
Band	11 D|11 64.24 cM	End	101,017,245 bp
RNA expression pattern
Bgee	Human / Mouse (ortholog); Top expressed in: right testis; left testis; oocyte; gonad; gastrocnemius muscle; stromal cell of endometrium; trabecular bone; left ventricle; muscle of thigh; prefrontal cortex / Top expressed in: tail of embryo; abdominal wall; perirhinal cortex; entorhinal cortex; otic vesicle; yolk sac; genital tubercle; internal carotid artery; CA3 field; morula; More reference expression data
BioGPS	n/a
Gene ontology
Molecular function	nucleotide binding; GTP binding; structural constituent of cytoskeleton; protein binding; GTPase activity; identical protein binding
Cellular component	cytoplasm; ciliary basal body; recycling endosome; cytosol; centrosome; pericentriolar material; apical part of cell; gamma-tubulin complex; cilium; microtubule organizing center; condensed nuclear chromosome; spindle microtubule; polar microtubule; cell leading edge; centriole; cytoplasmic microtubule; microtubule; cytoskeleton; non-motile cilium; nucleus; spindle
Biological process	meiotic spindle organization; G2/M transition of mitotic cell cycle; cytoplasmic microtubule organization; microtubule-based process; microtubule cytoskeleton organization; microtubule nucleation; ciliary basal body-plasma membrane docking; regulation of G2/M transition of mitotic cell cycle; mitotic sister chromatid segregation; mitotic cell cycle; mitotic spindle organization
Sources:Amigo / QuickGO
Orthologs
Databases	NCBI: entry; OMA: entry
Species	Human	Mouse
Entrez	7283	103733
Ensembl	ENSG00000131462	ENSMUSG00000035198
UniProt	P23258	P83887
RefSeq (mRNA)	NM_001070	NM_134024
RefSeq (protein)	NP_001061	NP_598785
Location (UCSC)	Chr 17: 42.61 – 42.62 Mb	Chr 11: 101.01 – 101.02 Mb
PubMed search
- Wikidata
View/Edit Human	View/Edit Mouse

Tubulin, gamma 1 is a protein in humans that is encoded by the TUBG1 gene. This gene encodes a member of the tubulin superfamily. The encoded protein localizes to the centrosome where it binds to microtubules as part of a complex referred to as the gamma-tubulin ring complex. The protein mediates microtubule nucleation and is required for microtubule formation and progression of the cell cycle.
