= Calcium signaling in cell division =

Calcium plays a crucial role in regulating the events of cellular division. Calcium acts both to modulate intracellular signaling as a secondary messenger and to facilitate structural changes as cells progress through division. Exquisite control of intracellular calcium dynamics are required, as calcium appears to play a role at multiple cell cycle checkpoints.

The major downstream calcium effectors are the calcium-binding calmodulin protein and downstream calmodulin-dependent protein kinases I / II. Evidence points to this signaling cascade as a major mediator of calcium signaling in cell division.

== Meiosis ==
Historically, one of the most well characterized roles of intracellular calcium is activation of the ovum after sperm fertilization. In deuterosome eggs (mammals, fish, amphibians, ascidians, sea urchins, etc.), successful sperm entry leads to a distinct rise in intracellular calcium ions (Ca^{2+}), with mammals and ascidians displaying a series of intracellular calcium spikes required for completion of meiosis.... Unfertilized vertebrate eggs arrest development after meiosis I. This developmental pause is attributed to the vaguely defined cytostatic factor (CSF). Current researches suggest "CSF" is actually multiple pathways working together to halt division at metaphase of meiosis II. Upon sperm entry into the egg, Ca^{2+} is released from intracellular stores, leading to inhibition of the CSF-arrest mechanism. Calmodulin dependent kinase II was shown to be the protein responsible for converting the Ca^{2+} influx signal into inhibition of CSF and activation of cyclin degradation machinery to degrade cyclin B, resulting in progression through meiosis II.

In mammals, this rise in Ca^{2+} was shown to be driven by IP3 stimulation induced by PLCζ provided by the sperm. In general, PLC enzymes stimulate calcium release by internal stores through the breakdown of PIP_{2} into IP_{3} and DAG.

== Mitosis ==
=== Signaling ===
Beyond the events of meiosis, changes in Ca^{2+} levels are observed in a variety of organisms at different stages of division, such as nuclear membrane breakdown and the metaphase-anaphase transition. Further, recent work has shown mechanically induced rapid entry into mitosis of cells paused in G2. Further, progression through division requires the presence of calcium (G1/S, G2/M, and metaphase/anaphase), suggesting checkpoints require a calcium-dependent signaling mechanism

==== G1/S ====
Entry into S-phase is calcium dependent. Depleting internal calcium stores inhibits initiation of DNA synthesis. One possible mechanism is that cyclin A synthesis is inhibited, preventing cdk2 activity which is required for initiation of DNA synthesis.

===== G2/M =====
Cell cycle progression is regulated by multiple pathways. It was shown using human cancer cell lines, that the G2/M checkpoint is regulated by CaMKII and MAPK crosstalk. Here, CaMKII activates MEK/ERK, which degrades the cell cycle arresting p27 protein

=== Disease ===
In general, transformed cells proliferate in a calcium-independent manner, whereas non-transformed cells show high sensitivity to extra-cellular calcium concentration, suggesting oncogenic growth may include disruption of calcium signaling.

=== Chromatin Structure ===
Condensation of chromatin is a vital step in cell division, allowing cells to equally distribute chromosomes to the daughter cells. Recent work has suggested that Ca^{2+} is required for enabling chromatin condensation in prometaphase. Calcium was found to concentrate on condensed DNA to much higher levels compared to normal cytosolic calcium concentration. The role of calcium in condensation was independent of CAMK function, suggesting a purely structural role of Ca^{2+} in chromatin compaction. Further, this result was demonstrated in vitro with extracted chromatin, emphasizing that the mere presence of Ca^{2+} can influence the structure of chromatin
