= Jadranka =

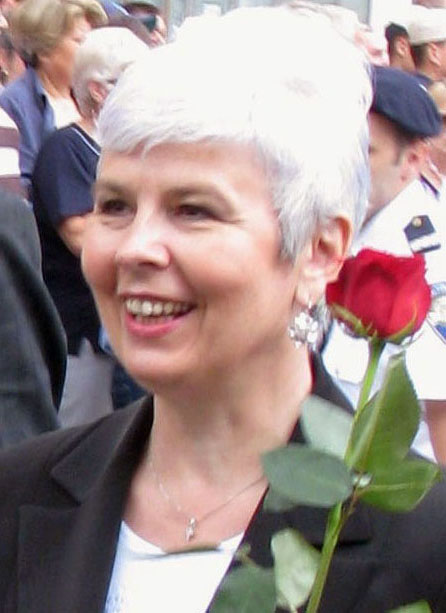
Jadranka Kosor, 2009

Jadranka is a feminine given name, the South Slavic variant of Adriana. Notable people with the name include:

- Jadranka Barjaktarović (born 1981), Montenegrin singer
- Jadranka Đokić (born 1981), Croatian actress
- Jadranka Joksimović (born 1978), Serbian politician
- Jadranka Jovanović (born 1958), Serbian opera singer
- Jadranka Kosor (born 1953), Croatian politician
- Jadranka Lončarek, Croatian biologist
- Jadranka Pejanović (1979–2018), Serbian actress
- Jadranka Skorin-Kapov (born 1955), Croatian academic
- Jadranka Stojaković (1950–2016), Bosnian singer-songwriter
- Jadranka Travaš-Sejdić, New Zealand academic
