= TUBE1 =

Protein-coding gene in the species Homo sapiens

Identifiers
- Aliases: TUBE1, TUBE, dJ142L7.2, tubulin epsilon 1
- External IDs: OMIM: 607345; MGI: 1919174; GeneCards: TUBE1

Gene location (Human)
Chr.	Chromosome 6 (human)
Band	6q21	Start	112,070,663 bp
Band	6q21	End	112,087,529 bp

Gene location (Mouse)
Chr.	Chromosome 10 (mouse)
Band	10|10 B1	Start	39,133,976 bp
Band	10|10 B1	End	39,152,542 bp
RNA expression pattern
Bgee	Human / Mouse (ortholog); Top expressed in: right hemisphere of cerebellum; oocyte; secondary oocyte; pancreatic epithelial cell; Achilles tendon; body of uterus; right lobe of liver; cardiac muscle tissue of right atrium; right auricle of heart; C1 segment / Top expressed in: thymus; secondary oocyte; medullary collecting duct; hand; neural layer of retina; primary oocyte; primitive streak; zygote; renal corpuscle; genital tubercle; More reference expression data
BioGPS	n/a
Gene ontology
Molecular function	nucleotide binding; GTP binding; structural constituent of cytoskeleton; GTPase activity
Cellular component	cytoplasm; microtubule; pericentriolar material; cytoskeleton; microtubule organizing center
Biological process	centrosome cycle; microtubule-based process; microtubule cytoskeleton organization; mitotic cell cycle
Sources:Amigo / QuickGO
Orthologs
Databases	NCBI: entry; OMA: entry
Species	Human	Mouse
Entrez	51175	71924
Ensembl	ENSG00000074935	ENSMUSG00000019845
UniProt	Q9UJT0	Q9D6T1
RefSeq (mRNA)	NM_016262	NM_028006
RefSeq (protein)	NP_057346	NP_082282
Location (UCSC)	Chr 6: 112.07 – 112.09 Mb	Chr 10: 39.13 – 39.15 Mb
PubMed search
- Wikidata
View/Edit Human	View/Edit Mouse

Tubulin, epsilon 1 is a protein in humans that is encoded by the TUBE1 gene. This gene encodes a member of the tubulin superfamily. This protein localizes to the centriolar sub-distal appendages that are associated with the older of the two centrioles after centrosome duplication. This protein plays a central role in organization of the microtubules during centriole duplication
