= Aster (cell biology) =

Cellular structure shaped like a star

This diagram depicts the organization of a typical mitotic spindle found in animal cells. Chromosomes are attached to kinetochore microtubules via a multiprotein complex called the kinetochore. Polar microtubules interdigitate at the spindle midzone and push the spindle poles apart via motor proteins. Astral microtubules anchor the spindle poles to the cell membrane. Microtubule polymerization is nucleated at the microtubule organizing center.

An aster is a cellular structure shaped like a star, consisting of a centrosome and its associated microtubules during the early stages of mitosis in an animal cell. Asters do not form during mitosis in plants. Astral rays, composed of microtubules, radiate from the centrosphere and look like a cloud. Astral rays are one variant of microtubule which comes out of the centrosome; others include kinetochore microtubules and polar microtubules.

During mitosis, there are five stages of cell division: Prophase, Prometaphase, Metaphase, Anaphase, and Telophase. During prophase, two aster-covered centrosomes migrate to opposite sides of the nucleus in preparation of mitotic spindle formation. During prometaphase there is fragmentation of the nuclear envelope and formation of the mitotic spindles. During metaphase, the kinetochore microtubules extending from each centrosome connect to the centromeres of the chromosomes. Next, during anaphase, the kinetochore microtubules pull the sister chromatids apart into individual chromosomes and pull them towards the centrosomes, located at opposite ends of the cell. This allows the cell to divide properly with each daughter cell containing full replicas of chromosomes. In some cells, the orientation of the asters determines the plane of division upon which the cell will divide.

== Astral microtubules ==
Astral microtubules are a subpopulation of microtubules, which only exist during and immediately before mitosis. They are defined as any microtubule originating from the centrosome which does not connect to a kinetochore. Astral microtubules develop in the actin skeleton and interact with the cell cortex to aid in spindle orientation. They are organized into radial arrays around the centrosomes. The turn-over rate of this population of microtubules is higher than any other population.

The role of astral microtubules is assisted by dyneins specific to this role. These dyneins have their light chains (static portion) attached to the cell membrane, and their globular parts (dynamic portions) attached to the microtubules. The globular chains attempt to move towards the centrosome, but as they are bound to the cell membrane, this results in pulling the centrosomes towards the membrane, thus assisting cytokinesis.

Astral microtubules are not required for the progression of mitosis, but they are required to ensure the fidelity of the process. The function of astral microtubules can be generally considered as determination of cell geometry. They are absolutely required for correct positioning and orientation of the mitotic spindle apparatus, and are thus involved in determining the cell division site based on the geometry and polarity of the cells.

The maintenance of astral microtubules is dependent on centrosomal integrity. It is also dependent on several microtubule-associated proteins such as EB1 and adenomatous polyposis coli (APC).

Growth of Microtubules

Asters grow through nucleation and polymerization. At the negative ends of the aster centrosomes will nucleate (form a nucleus) and anchor to the microtubules. At the positive end, polymerization of the aster will occur. Cortical dynein, a motor protein, moves along the microtubules of the cell and plays a key role in the growth and inhibition of aster microtubules. A dynein that is barrier-attached can inhibit and trigger growth.

== See also ==
- Mitosis
- Centrosome
- Centriole
- Chromosome
