= Basal body =

Protein structure at the base of cilia or flagella

Schematic of the eukaryotic flagellum. 1-axoneme, 2-cell membrane, 3-IFT (Intraflagellar transport), 4-Basal body, 5-Cross section of flagellum, 6-Triplets of microtubules of basal body.

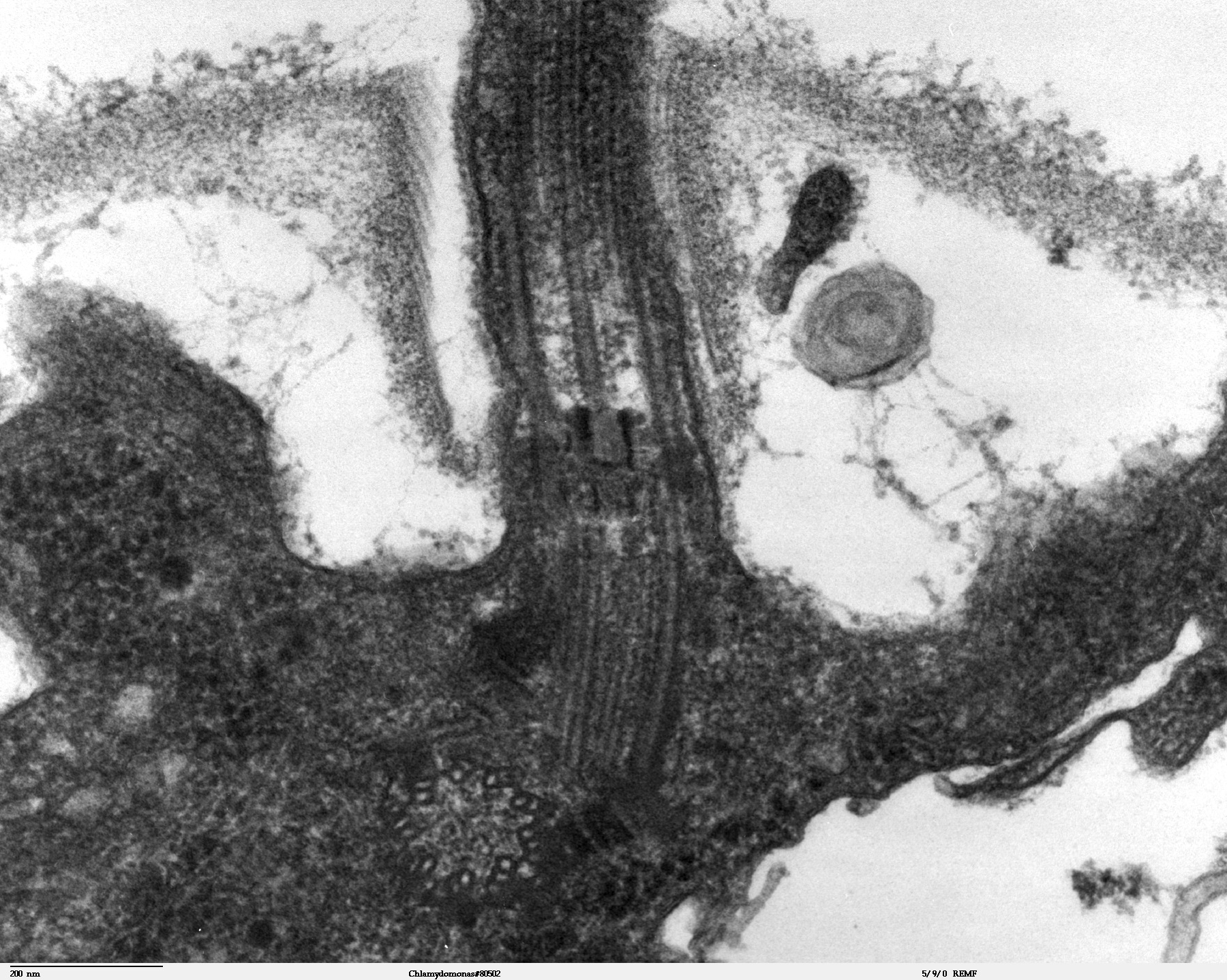
Longitudinal section through the flagella area in Chlamydomonas reinhardtii. In the cell apex is the basal body that is the anchoring site for a flagellum. Basal bodies originate from and have a substructure similar to that of centrioles, with nine peripheral microtubule triplets (see structure at bottom center of image).

A basal body, basal granule, or kinetosome, and in older literature blepharoplast, is a protein complex structure found at the base of a cilium, a eukaryotic flagellum or a bacterial flagellum. The basal body was named by Theodor Wilhelm Engelmann in 1880. It is formed from a centriole and several additional protein structures, and is, essentially, a modified centriole. The basal body serves as a nucleation site for the growth of the axoneme microtubules. Centrioles, from which basal bodies are derived, act as anchoring sites for proteins that in turn anchor microtubules, and are known as the microtubule organizing center (MTOC). These microtubules provide structure and facilitate movement of vesicles and other organelles within many eukaryotic cells.

== Assembly and structure ==
Cilia and basal bodies form during quiescence or the G1 phase of the cell cycle. Before the cell enters G1 phase, i.e. before the formation of the cilium, the mother centriole serves as a component of the centrosome.

In cells that are destined to have only one primary cilium, the mother centriole differentiates into the basal body upon entry into G1 or quiescence. Thus, the basal body in such a cell is derived from the centriole.

The basal body differs from the mother centriole in at least two aspects. First, basal bodies have basal feet, which are anchored to cytoplasmic microtubules and are necessary for polarized alignment of the cilium. Second, basal bodies have pinwheel-shaped transition fibers that originate from the appendages of mother centriole.

In multiciliated cells, however, in many cases basal bodies are not made from centrioles but are generated de novo from a special protein structure called the deuterosome.

== Function ==
During cell cycle dormancy, basal bodies organize primary cilia and reside at the cell cortex in proximity to plasma membrane. On cell cycle entry, cilia resorb and the basal body migrates to the nucleus where it functions to organize centrosomes. Centrioles, basal bodies, and cilia are important for mitosis, polarity, cell division, protein trafficking, signaling, motility and sensation.

Mutations in proteins that localize to basal bodies are associated with several human ciliary diseases, including Bardet–Biedl syndrome, orofaciodigital syndrome, Joubert syndrome, cone-rod dystrophy, Meckel syndrome, and nephronophthisis.

Regulation of basal body production and spatial orientation is a function of the nucleotide-binding domain of γ-tubulin.

Plants lack centrioles and only lower plants (such as mosses and ferns) with motile sperm have flagella and basal bodies.
