= Jadranko =

- Pronunciation: Serbo-Croatian: [jaˈdraːko] Bulgarian: [jɐˈdrako]
- Gender: Male

Origin
- Origin: jadran "Adriatic Sea" and -ko diminutive

Other names
- Related names: Jadran

Jadranko is a Slavic male given name commonly found in Croatia, Serbia, Bulgaria, North Macedonia, and Bosnia and Herzegovina. It is derived from Jadran, which means "The Adriatic" in South Slavic languages.

In Slovenia, the name Jadranko is the 930th most common male given name.

== Notable people ==
- Jadranko Bogičević (born 1983), Bosnian Serb footballer
- Jadranko Crnić (1928–2008), Croatian lawyer, former chairman of the Croatian Constitutional Court
- Jadranko Džihan (born 1964), Bosnian musician
- Jadranko Prlić (born 1951), Bosnian Croat politician
- Jadranko Topić (born 1949), retired Yugoslav footballer

== See also ==
- Adrian
