= Centrin 1 =

Protein-coding gene in the species Homo sapiens

CETN1
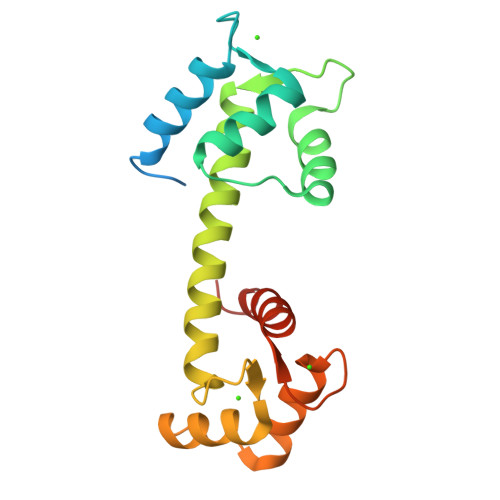

Identifiers
- Aliases: CETN1, CEN1, CETN, centrin 1
- External IDs: OMIM: 603187; MGI: 1347086; GeneCards: CETN1

Gene location (Human)
Chr.	Chromosome 18 (human)
Band	18p11.32	Start	580,380 bp
Band	18p11.32	End	582,114 bp

Gene location (Mouse)
Chr.	Chromosome 18 (mouse)
Band	18|18 A1	Start	9,615,524 bp
Band	18|18 A1	End	9,619,478 bp
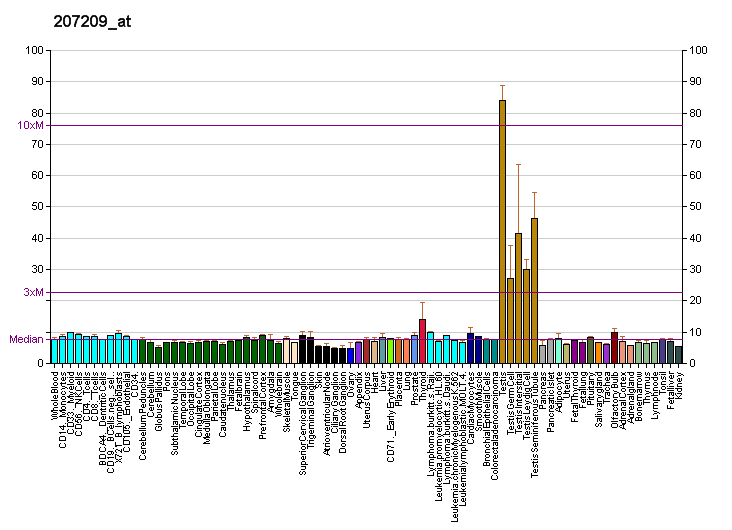
RNA expression pattern
Bgee	Human / Mouse (ortholog); Top expressed in: left testis; right testis; sperm; testicle; human musculoskeletal system; muscular system; muscle; muscle; skeletal muscle; lower limb muscles / Top expressed in: spermatid; spermatocyte; seminiferous tubule; lumbar subsegment of spinal cord; motor neuron; tibiofemoral joint; submandibular gland; spinal ganglia; carotid body; trachea; More reference expression data
BioGPS	More reference expression data
Gene ontology
Molecular function	microtubule binding; calcium ion binding; G-protein beta/gamma-subunit complex binding; heterotrimeric G-protein binding; protein binding; metal ion binding
Cellular component	cytoplasm; microtubule organizing center; centrosome; spindle pole; cytoskeleton; photoreceptor connecting cilium; centriole; nucleus
Biological process	cell cycle; cellular response to heat; cell division; mitotic cytokinesis; centriole replication; regulation of centrosome duplication; calcium-mediated signaling; regulation of cytokinesis; microtubule cytoskeleton organization; nucleotide-excision repair; mitotic cell cycle
Sources:Amigo / QuickGO
Orthologs
Databases	NCBI: entry; OMA: entry
Species	Human	Mouse
Entrez	1068	26369
Ensembl	ENSG00000177143	ENSMUSG00000050996
UniProt	Q12798	P41209
RefSeq (mRNA)	NM_004066	NM_007593
RefSeq (protein)	NP_004057	NP_031619
Location (UCSC)	Chr 18: 0.58 – 0.58 Mb	Chr 18: 9.62 – 9.62 Mb
PubMed search
- Wikidata
View/Edit Human	View/Edit Mouse

Centrin-1 is a protein that in humans is encoded by the CETN1 gene. It belongs to the centrin family of proteins.

The protein encoded by this gene plays important roles in the determination of centrosome position and segregation, and in the process of microtubule severing. This encoded protein is localized to the centrosome of interphase cells, and redistributes to the region of the spindle poles during mitosis, reflecting the dynamic behavior of the centrosome during the cell cycle.
