= Deuterosome =

Protein structure within a multiciliated cell

In cell biology, a deuterosome is a protein structure within a multiciliated cell (such as an epithelial cell of respiratory tract) that produces multiple centrioles.

Most cells in the human body possess one primary cilium, a relatively small protrusion of the cell membrane that looks like a stick or a finger under the electron microscope. Primary cilium is typically used by the cell as a sensory organelle, or antenna. Some cells, however, have numerous cilia which they use to generate directed fluid flow. Examples include: epithelial cells of the respiratory tract, in which multiple cilia are used for mucus clearance; the oviduct, in which cilia help the egg migrate to the uterus; and others.

Each cilium has a basal body formed from a centriole to which it is anchored and from which it starts to grow after each cell division, when a new daughter cell is formed. Centrioles typically replicate once during cell division, thus allowing for only one cilium for a daughter cell. Multiciliated cells, on the other hand, need to produce more than 100 centrioles in order to grow multiple cilia. This problem is solved by the existence of deuterosome, a structure thought to be formed from amorphous filamentous material and able to make many centrioles at once.

The evidence of the existence of deuterosome first came from electron microscopy work in various multiciliated tissues. It was found that both centriole duplication and de novo generation of centrioles occurs in such cells. The generation of new centrioles which will serve as basal bodies for multiple cilia is due to a cytoplasmic structure, which was termed the “deuterosome” by Sorokin.
