= Senex (disambiguation) =

Senex is a Latin word literally meaning a man of old age.

Senex may also refer to:

- Wise old man, a Jungian archetype also referred to as the senex
- The senex amans, in stage comedy, an old man unsuitably in love with a much younger woman
- The senex iratus, in stage comedy, an old man who irrationally opposes the love of the young couple
- John Senex (1678-1740), English cartographer
- Senex, a poem by Sir John Betjeman describing an older man's guilty, but harmless, pleasure in watching young women playing sports
- Senex, a character in the novel A Wind in the Door, a subcellular creature
- "Senex" (Alan Lascelles), the pseudonymous author of the Lascelles Principles (1950)
- Senex Energy, an Australian company

== See also ==
- Cenex (disambiguation)
- Old man (disambiguation)
- Elder (disambiguation)
