= Centrin 3 =

Protein-coding gene in the species Homo sapiens

CETN3

Identifiers
- Aliases: CETN3, CDC31, CEN3, centrin 3
- External IDs: OMIM: 602907; MGI: 1097706; GeneCards: CETN3

Gene location (Human)
Chr.	Chromosome 5 (human)
Band	5q14.3	Start	90,392,257 bp
Band	5q14.3	End	90,409,766 bp
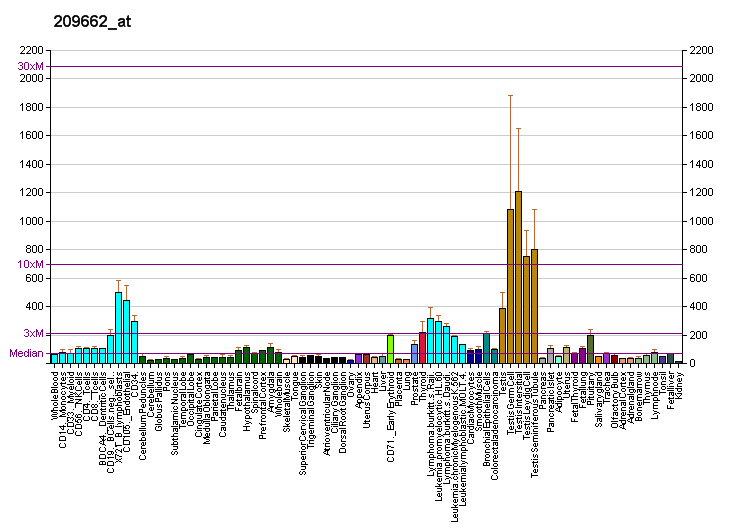
RNA expression pattern
Bgee	Human / Mouse (ortholog); Top expressed in: oocyte; left testis; right testis; secondary oocyte; bronchial epithelial cell; palpebral conjunctiva; germinal epithelium; ventricular zone; Achilles tendon; sperm / n/a; More reference expression data
BioGPS	More reference expression data
Gene ontology
Molecular function	calcium ion binding; protein binding; metal ion binding; microtubule binding
Cellular component	cytoplasm; microtubule organizing center; centriole; centrosome; nucleolus; cytoskeleton; nucleus; nucleotide-excision repair factor 2 complex; half bridge of spindle pole body; transcription export complex 2; nuclear pore nuclear basket; nuclear envelope; nuclear pore
Biological process	cell cycle; centrosome cycle; cell division; microtubule nucleation; calcium-mediated signaling; spindle pole body duplication; mitotic spindle pole body duplication; protein transport; mRNA transport
Sources:Amigo / QuickGO
Orthologs
Databases	NCBI: entry; OMA: entry
Species	Human	Mouse
Entrez	1070	12626
Ensembl	ENSG00000153140	n/a
UniProt	O15182	O35648
RefSeq (mRNA)	NM_004365; NM_001297765; NM_001297768	NM_007684
RefSeq (protein)	NP_001284694; NP_001284697; NP_004356	NP_031710
Location (UCSC)	Chr 5: 90.39 – 90.41 Mb	n/a
PubMed search
- Wikidata
View/Edit Human	View/Edit Mouse

Centrin-3 is a protein that in humans is encoded by the CETN3 gene. It belongs to the centrin family of proteins.

The protein encoded by this gene contains four EF-hand calcium binding domains, and is a member of the centrin protein family. Centrins are evolutionarily conserved proteins similar to the CDC31 protein of S. cerevisiae. Yeast CDC31 is located at the centrosome of interphase and mitotic cells, where it plays a fundamental role in centrosome duplication and separation. Multiple forms of the proteins similar to the yeast centrin have been identified in human and other mammalian cells, some of which have been shown to be associated with centrosome fractions. This protein appears to be one of the most abundant centrins associated with centrosome, which suggests a similar function to its yeast counterpart.
