= Tektin =

Tektin family

Identifiers
- Symbol: Tektin
- Pfam: PF03148
- InterPro: IPR000435
Available protein structures:
- PDB: IPR000435 PF03148 (ECOD; PDBsum)
- AlphaFold: IPR000435; PF03148

Tektins are cytoskeletal proteins found in cilia and flagella as structural components of outer doublet microtubules. They are also present in centrioles and basal bodies. They are polymeric in nature, and form filaments.

They include TEKT1, TEKT2, TEKT3, TEKT4, TEKT5.

== Structure ==
Tektin filaments are 2 to 3 nm diameter with two alpha helical segments. They have the consensus amino acid sequence of RPNVELCRD. Different types of tektins, designated as A (53 kDa), B (51 kDa), C (47 kDa) form dimers, trimers and oligomers in various combinations and are also associated with tubulin in the microtubule. Tektins A and B form heteropolymeric protofilaments whereas tektin C forms homodimers. Tektin filaments are present in a supercoiled state. This structure of tektins suggests that they are evolutionarily related to intermediate filaments.

The proteins are predicted to form extended rods composed of 2 alpha- helical segments (~180 residues long) capable of forming coiled coils, interrupted by non-helical linkers. The 2 segments are similar in sequence, indicating a gene duplication event. Along each tektin rod, cysteine residues occur with a periodicity of ~8 nm, coincident with the axial repeat of tubulin dimers in microtubules. It is proposed that the assembly of tektin heteropolymers produces filaments with repeats of 8, 16, 24, 32, 40, 48 and 96 nm, generating the basis for the complex spatial arrangements of axonemal components.

== Function ==
Tektins as integral components of microtubules are essential for their structural integrity. A mutation in the tektin-t genes may lead to defects in flagellar activity which could manifest, for instance, as immotility of sperm leading to male infertility. Tektins are thought to be involved in the assembly of the basal body.

The study of tektins has also been found to be useful in phylogeny, to establish evolutionary relationship between organisms.

Amino acid sequences of tektins are well conserved, with significant similarity between mouse and human homologs.

== See also ==
- Tubulin
- Microtubule
