= Tektin-1 =

Protein-coding gene in the species Homo sapiens

TEKT1

Identifiers
- Aliases: TEKT1, tektin 1
- External IDs: OMIM: 609002; MGI: 1333819; GeneCards: TEKT1

Gene location (Human)
Chr.	Chromosome 17 (human)
Band	17p13.1	Start	6,789,133 bp
Band	17p13.1	End	6,831,761 bp

Gene location (Mouse)
Chr.	Chromosome 11 (mouse)
Band	11|11 B4	Start	72,235,548 bp
Band	11|11 B4	End	72,253,268 bp
RNA expression pattern
Bgee	Human / Mouse (ortholog); Top expressed in: bronchial epithelial cell; right uterine tube; olfactory zone of nasal mucosa; mucosa of paranasal sinus; left testis; right testis; sperm; epithelium of nasopharynx; testicle; nasal epithelium / Top expressed in: spermatid; seminiferous tubule; spermatocyte; utricle; olfactory epithelium; morula; vestibular sensory epithelium; Epithelium of choroid plexus; right lung lobe; choroid plexus of fourth ventricle; More reference expression data
BioGPS	n/a
Gene ontology
Molecular function	protein binding
Cellular component	cytoplasm; microtubule cytoskeleton; cell projection; cilium; microtubule; cytoskeleton; nucleus; sperm flagellum; motile cilium
Biological process	flagellated sperm motility; cilium assembly; cilium movement involved in cell motility
Sources:Amigo / QuickGO
Orthologs
Databases	NCBI: entry; OMA: entry
Species	Human	Mouse
Entrez	83659	21689
Ensembl	ENSG00000167858	ENSMUSG00000020799
UniProt	Q969V4	Q9DAJ2
RefSeq (mRNA)	NM_053285	NM_001282006; NM_001282007; NM_011569
RefSeq (protein)	NP_444515	NP_001268935; NP_001268936; NP_035699
Location (UCSC)	Chr 17: 6.79 – 6.83 Mb	Chr 11: 72.24 – 72.25 Mb
PubMed search
- Wikidata
View/Edit Human	View/Edit Mouse

Tektin-1 is a protein that in humans is encoded by the TEKT1 gene.

== Function ==
This gene product belongs to the tektin family of proteins. Tektins comprise a family of filament-forming proteins that are coassembled with tubulins to form ciliary and flagellar microtubules. This gene is predominantly expressed in the testis and in mouse, tektin 1 mRNA was localized to the spermatocytes and round spermatids in the seminiferous tubules, indicating that it may play a role in spermatogenesis.
