= Procentriole =

A procentriole (/proʊˈsɛntri.oʊl/ proh-SEN-tree-ohl) is a centriole or basal body in a stage of early development. That is, it is what is to become a set of triplets of microtubules destined to form spindles of fibres that will separate chromosomes during mitosis and in order to act as anchoring sites for some proteins.

Procentrioles are generally assembled canonically in association with pre-existing centrioles that are loosely connected to each other. The environment suitable for procentriole formation is provided by the base of each centriole. Procentrioles assemble perpendicular to existing centrioles. A cylindrical structure with a diameter around 130 nm forms at the onset of assembly. Free microtubules elongate the initial cylindrical structure of procentrioles to form centrioles.

An alternative way of procentriole assembly has also been discovered. Instead of forming in the vicinity of pre-exisintg centrioles, this “de novo” pathway is activated during ciliogenesis, in which many procentrioles are synthesized in a single cell from electron-dense areas of the cytoplasm. This discovery was made through observation after removing the pre-existing centrioles using laser microbeam. However, studies indicate that procentriole assembly via the canonical pathway is more stable for proliferating cells. Only one procentriole forms next to each centriole during a cell cycle.

== See also ==
- Asteroid body
