= Jadranka Pejanović =

Serbian actress

- Born: January 19, 1979; Belgrade, SR Serbia, SFR Yugoslavia
- Died: September 30, 2018 (aged 39); Belgrade, Serbia
- Occupation: Actress
- Years active: 2005–2018
- Children: 1

Jadranka Pejanović (19 January 1979 – 30 September 2018) was a Serbian actress and journalist. She worked on television channels N1 and B92.

== Early life and career ==
Jadranka Pejanovic was born in Belgrade on January 19, 1979 as Jadranka Bugarski. She finished the Philological Gymnasium. She graduated from the Academy of Arts in Belgrade, in the class of professor Branislav Jerinić. She has played in several theater performances, puppet theater, koreodrams, as well as several films and domestic series. From the puppet shows and theatrical roles, in 2008, she stepped into the world of television, in the newsroom TV B92. She led the show "Planet", then for several months she was the leader of the morning program "TV Dizanje" and reported from across the country all over Serbia, and then she went to the news program. She was co-author of the documentary film "Untold Stories", about the life of Zoran Djindjic. She has been working on N1 Television since its inception. In the editorial office of this television she designed the show "Scene", in which she followed events on the cultural scene of Serbia and the region. She was the author of the "Net Context", and she also featured the "New Day" show. She has done dozens of interviews with the most prominent figures of cultural and public life, she is the author of several documentary reports in the Unsourced series. During the floods in 2014 she reported to the US Si-En-En. She has been actively working with animated and featured films and studio studies for Studio, Gold Digi Net, Mobi, Ideogram, Saundlate, Wocaw and Bozomiks.

== Death ==
She died on September 30, 2018, in Belgrade, at the age of 39.

== Filmography ==
Film
Year	Title	Role	Notes
2014	The November Man	Newscaster	(O / S Ministry)

== Serbian voice roles ==
Dubbing year	Movie/series	Character(s)
2004	Groove Squad	Chrissy, etc.
2004	Sabrina: Friends Forever	Sabrina Spellman, Queen Enchantra, etc.
2005	Lassie's Rescue Rangers	Susan Turner, Ben Turner Jr.
2005	Madeline: Lost in Paris	Madeline, etc.
2005	Pippi Longstocking (1997 TV series) (Soundlight)	Pippi
2005	Raining Cats and Frogs	Juliette, The female elephant
2005	The New Adventures of Zorro (1981)	Maria, Lucia
2005	The Secret Lives of Waldo Kitty	Felicia
2006	Glup, una aventura sin desperdicio	Alicia
2006	Kikoriki (Bozomix)	Rosa
2006	Preston Pig	Preston
2006	Supertramps	
2006	The Forgotten Toys	Annie
2006	The Princess and the Pea	Hildegard, Daria's stepmother, princesses, pig
2007	The First Snow of Winter	Sean McDuck, Mother Duck
2007	Tiny Heroes	Angie, etc.
2007	Tutenstein	Cleo Carter
2010	Horseland (Ideogram)	Alma Rodriguez, Chloe Stilton, Teeny, Scarlet, Pepper, Button
2010	Sabrina's Secret Life	Cassandra, Maritza, Zelda Spellman, Queen Enchantra
2011	Puss in Boots (2011)	Jill
2011	The Smurfs	Grace Winslow
2012	A Fairy Tale of Tibet	various characters
2012	Barbie in the Nutcracker (Ideogram)	Aunt Elisabeth, Owl
2012	Barbie as Rapunzel (Ideogram)	Gothel, Penelopi
2012	Barbie of Swan Lake (Ideogram)	Layla, Queen
2012	Barbie as the Princess and the Pauper (Ideogram)	Madame Carp
2012	Barbie: Fairytopia (Ideogram)	Dandelion, Laverna
2012	Barbie as the Island Princess (Ideogram)	Tika, Queen Ariana
2012	Barbie Mariposa (Ideogram)	
2012	Barbie & the Diamond Castle (Ideogram)	Alexa (speaking), Lydia
2012	Barbie and the Three Musketeers (Ideogram)	Viveca
2012	Barbie in A Mermaid Tale (Ideogram)	
2012	Barbie: A Fashion Fairytale (Ideogram)	Skipper, Aunt Millie
2012	Barbie: A Fairy Secret (Ideogram)	Carrie, Raquelle
2012	Barbie: Princess Charm School (Ideogram)	Isla, Mrs Privet
2012	Barbie: A Perfect Christmas (Ideogram)	Skipper (speaking & singing It's Gonna Be Amazing)
2012	Bigfoot Presents: Meteor and the Mighty Monster Trucks	Meteor T. Rover, Junkboy, etc.
2012	Dino Rampage	Lina, etc.
2012	Dragon Hunters (2008)	Zoé
2012	Huntik: Secrets & Seekers	Narrator
2012	Megaminimals	Mrs. Meadow (teacher giraffe), Penguin
2012	Ninja Turtles: The Next Mutation	Venus de Milo, Vam–Mi
2012	Power Rangers Samurai	Mia, Emily, Dayu
2012	Puppy in My Pocket: Adventures in Pocketville	Kate, Eva
2012	Shanmao & Jimi	Jimi, Pen
2012	The Secret World of Benjamin Bear (Ideogram)	Howie Bear, Laura Tanner, etc.
2012	Tinker Bell and the Secret of the Wings	Iridessa
2012	Wreck-It Ralph	Mary
2012	Tork	Iris, etc.
2012	Winx Club (S5)	Bloom, Icy (E1-13)
2013	Big Time Rush	Lucy Stone (some episodes)
2013–2017	PAW Patrol	Ryder
2013	Pokémon (S14)	Iris
2013	Swindle	Receptionist
2013	The Fairly OddParents	Vicky (some episodes), etc.
2013	The Smurfs 2	Grace Winslow
2013	Totally Spies! (S6, Gold Digi Net)	Alex
2014	A Fairly Odd Summer	Vicky
2014	Tinker Bell and the Pirate Fairy	Iridessa
2014	Mr. Peabody & Sherman	
2014	Nicky Deuce	Nicky's mom
2014	Pound Puppies (2010) (Studio)	Strudel
2014–2018	The Thundermans	Barb Thunderman (some episodes)
2015	Bubble Guppies	Demanda
2015–2018	Nicky, Ricky, Dicky & Dawn	Oscar, Mack, Karen (some episodes); YOCO
2015	The New Adventures of Peter Pan	Wendy
2015	Tinker Bell and the Legend of the NeverBeast	Iridessa
2016	ALVINNN!!! and The Chipmunks	Harmony
2016	Every Witch Way	Lily Archer
2016–2017	Game Shakers	Jackie Griffin, Kayla Bunger
2016	Lost in the West	Future Jane
2016	Popples	Sunny
2016	The Loud House	additional voices
2017	Bunsen Is A Beast	Bunsen's Mom
2017	Henry Danger	Noelle (03x09)
2017	Legends of the Hidden Temple	additional voices
2017–2018	SpongeBob SquarePants (Gold Digi Net, TV dub)	additional voices
2018	Escape from Mr. Lemoncello's Library	Dr. Zinchenko
2018	Fantastic Journey to Oz	The Crow, etc.
2018	Instant Mom	Stephanie Phillips (some episodes)
