= Pericentriolar material =

Pericentriolar material (PCM, sometimes also called pericent matrix) is a highly structured, dense mass of protein which makes up the part of the animal centrosome that surrounds the two centrioles. The PCM contains proteins responsible for microtubule nucleation and microtubule anchoring. including γ-tubulin, pericentrin and ninein.

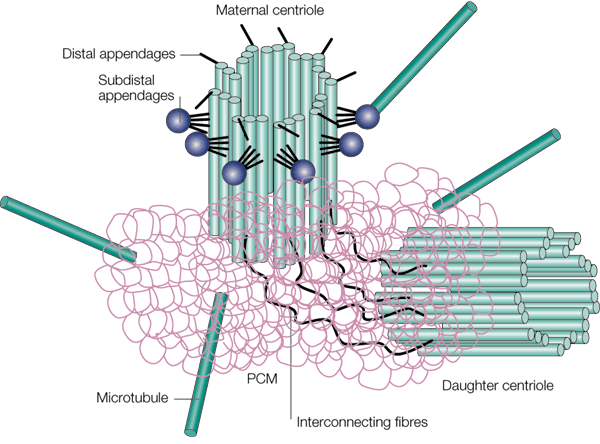
The purple mesh represents pericentriolar material (PCM)

Although the PCM appears amorphous by electron microscopy, super-resolution microscopy finds that it is highly organized. The PCM have 9-fold symmetry that mimics the symmetry of the centriole. Some PCM proteins are organized such that one end of the protein is found near the centriole and the other end is further away from the centriole. The PCM size is dynamic during the cell cycle. After cell division, the PCM size is reduced in a process named centrosome reduction. During the G2 phase of the cell cycle, the PCM grows in size in a process named centrosome maturation.

According to the Gene Ontology, the following human proteins are associated with the PCM :

- BBS4, Bardet-Biedl syndrome 4 protein
- Lck, Proto-oncogene tyrosine-protein kinase LCK
- PCM1, Pericentriolar material 1 protein
- TNKS, Tankyrase-1
- TNKS2, Tankyrase-2
- TUBE1, Tubulin epsilon chain
- PCNT, pericentrin, a matrix scaffold protein
- CDK5RAP2, cyclin dependant kinase receptor associated protein 2, binds gTubRCs that nucleate microtubules
- NEDD1, binds gTubRCs that stabilise microtubules
- Gamma Tubulin, nucleates microtubules
