= Microtubule organizing center =

Structure in eukaryotic cells

The microtubule-organizing center (MTOC) is a structure found in eukaryotic cells from which microtubules emerge. MTOCs have two main functions: the organization of eukaryotic flagella and cilia and the organization of the mitotic and meiotic spindle apparatus, which separate the chromosomes during cell division. The MTOC is a major site of microtubule nucleation and can be visualized in cells by immunohistochemical detection of γ-tubulin. The morphological characteristics of MTOCs vary between the different eukaryote groups. In animal cells, the two most important types of MTOCs are the basal bodies associated with cilia and flagella, and the centrosome associated with spindle formation.

== Organization ==
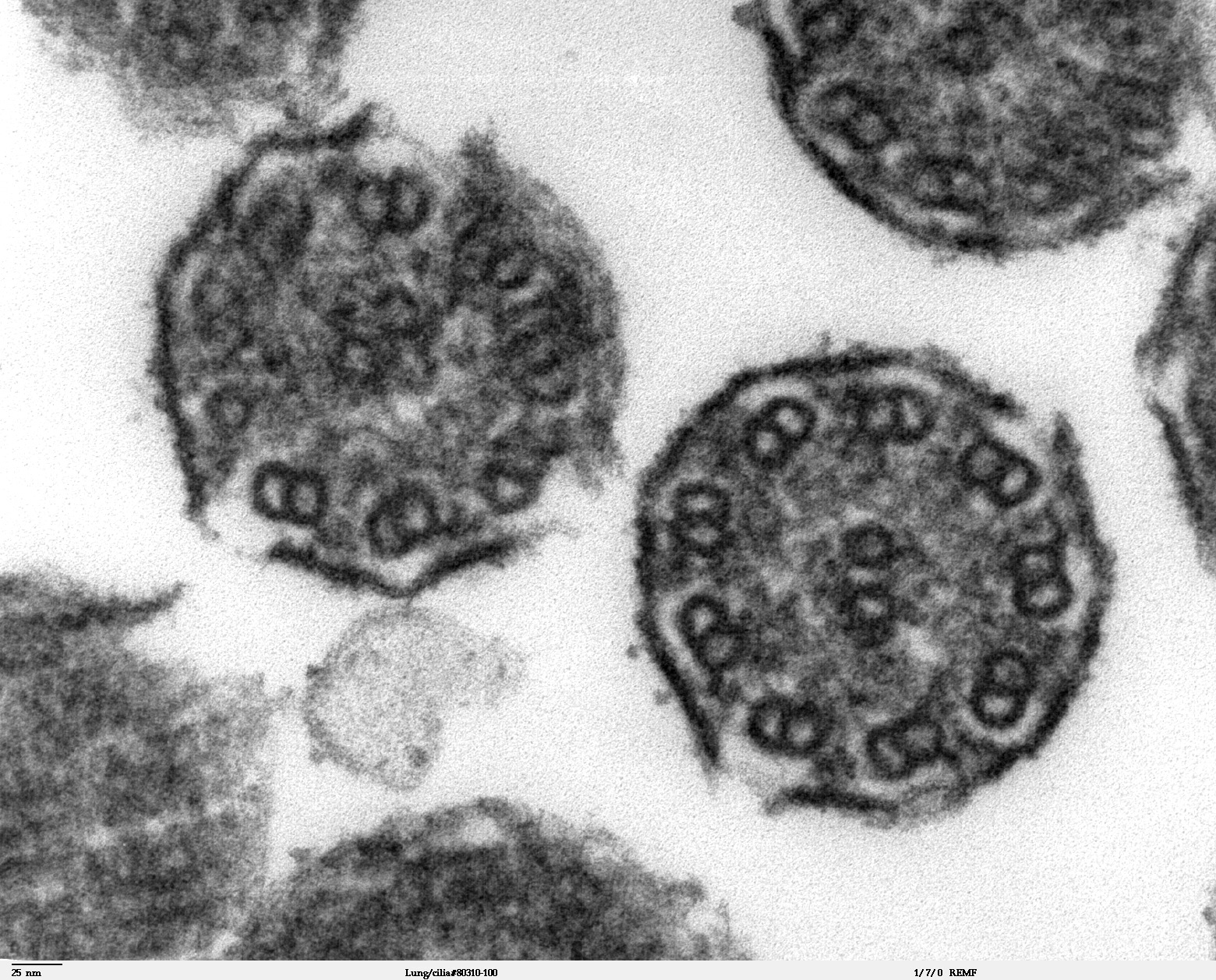
Microtubule arrangement in a 9+2 axoneme of bronchiolar cilia

Microtubule-organizing centers function as the site where microtubule formation begins, as well as a location where free-ends of microtubules attract to. Within the cells, microtubule-organizing centers can take on many different forms. An array of microtubules can arrange themselves in a pinwheel structure to form the basal bodies, which can lead to the formation of microtubule arrays in the cytoplasm or the 9+2 axoneme. Other arrangements range from fungi spindle pole bodies to the eukaryotic chromosomal kinetochores (flat, laminated plaques). MTOCs can be freely dispersed throughout the cytoplasm or centrally localized as foci. The most notable MTOCs are the centrosome at interphase and the mitotic spindle poles.

Centrioles can act as markers for MTOCs in the cell. If they are freely distributed in the cytoplasm, centrioles can gather during differentiation to become MTOCs. They can also be focused around a centrosome as a single MTOC, though centrosomes can work as an MTOC absent of centrioles.

== In interphase ==
Most animal cells have one MTOC during interphase, usually located near the nucleus, and generally associated closely with the Golgi apparatus. The MTOC is made up of a pair of centrioles at its center, and is surrounded by pericentriolar material (PCM) that is important for microtubule nucleation. Microtubules are anchored at the MTOC by their minus ends, while their plus ends continue to grow into the cell periphery. The polarity of the microtubules is important for cellular transport, as the motor proteins kinesin and dynein typically move preferentially in the "plus" and "minus" directions respectively, along a microtubule, allowing vesicles to be directed to or from the endoplasmic reticulum and Golgi apparatus. Particularly for the Golgi apparatus, structures associated with the apparatus travel towards the minus end of a microtubule and aid in the overall structure and site of the Golgi in the cell.

== Centrosomes ==
The centrosome is the most well understood MTOC. Movements of the microtubules are based on the actions of the centrosome. Each daughter cell after the cessation of mitosis contains one primary MTOC. Before cell division begins, the interphase MTOC replicates to form two distinct MTOCs (now typically referred to as centrosomes). During cell division, these centrosomes move to opposite ends of the cell and nucleate microtubules to help form the mitotic/meiotic spindle. If the MTOC does not replicate, the spindle cannot form, and mitosis ceases prematurely.

γ-tubulin is a protein located at the centrosome that nucleates the microtubules by interacting with the tubulin monomer subunit in the microtubule at the minus end. Organization of the microtubules at the MTOC, or centrosome in this case, is determined by the polarity of the microtubules defined by y-tubulin.

== Basal body ==
In epithelial cells, MTOCs also anchor and organize the microtubules that make up cilia. As with the centrosome, these MTOCs stabilize and give direction to the microtubules, in this case to allow unidirectional movement of the cilium itself, rather than vesicles moving along it.

== Spindle pole body ==
In yeasts and some algae, the MTOC is embedded into the nuclear envelope as a spindle pole body. Centrioles do not exist in the MTOCs of yeast and fungi. In these organisms, the nuclear envelope does not break down during mitosis and the spindle pole body serves to connect cytoplasmic with nuclear microtubules. The disc-shaped spindle pole body is organized into three layers: the central plaque, inner plaque, and outer plaque. The central plaque is embedded in the membrane, while the inner plaque is an amorphous intranuclear layer, and the outer plaque is the layer located in the cytoplasm.

== In plants ==
Plant cells lack centrioles or spindle pole bodies except in their flagellate male gametes, and they are entirely absent in the conifers and flowering plants. Instead, the nuclear envelope itself appears to function as the main MTOC for microtubule nucleation and spindle organization during plant cell mitosis.

== Signal transduction ==
The MTOC reorients itself during signal transduction, primarily during wound repair or immune responses. The MTOC is relocalized to a position between the edge of the cell and the nucleus in cells like macrophages, fibroblasts, and endothelial cells. Organelles like the Golgi apparatus aid in the reorientation of the MTOC which can occur rapidly. Transduction signals cause microtubules to grow or contract, as well as cause the centrosome to become motile. The MTOC is located in a perinuclear position and contains the negative ends of microtubules while the positive ends grow rapidly towards the edge of the cell. The Golgi apparatus reorients along with the MTOC, and together cause the cell to seemingly send a polarized signal.

In immune responses, upon interaction with a target cell in response to antigen-specific loaded antigen-presenting cells, immune cells, such as the T cells, natural killer cells, and cytotoxic T lymphocytes, localize their MTOCs near the contact zone between the immune cell and the target cell. For T cells, the T cell receptor signaling response causes the reorientation of the MTOC by microtubules shortening to bring the MTOC to the site of interaction of the T cell receptor.
