= ODF2 =

Protein-coding gene in the species Homo sapiens

Identifiers
- Aliases: ODF2, CT134, ODF2/1, ODF2/2, ODF84, outer dense fiber of sperm tails 2
- External IDs: OMIM: 602015; MGI: 1098824; HomoloGene: 1907; GeneCards: ODF2; OMA:ODF2 - orthologs

Gene location (Human)
| Chr. | Chromosome 9 (human) |
| Band | 9q34.11 | Start | 128,455,186 bp |
| Band | 9q34.11 | End | 128,501,292 bp |

Gene location (Mouse)
| Chr. | Chromosome 2 (mouse) |
| Band | 2 B|2 20.79 cM | Start | 29,779,233 bp |
| Band | 2 B|2 20.79 cM | End | 29,821,758 bp |
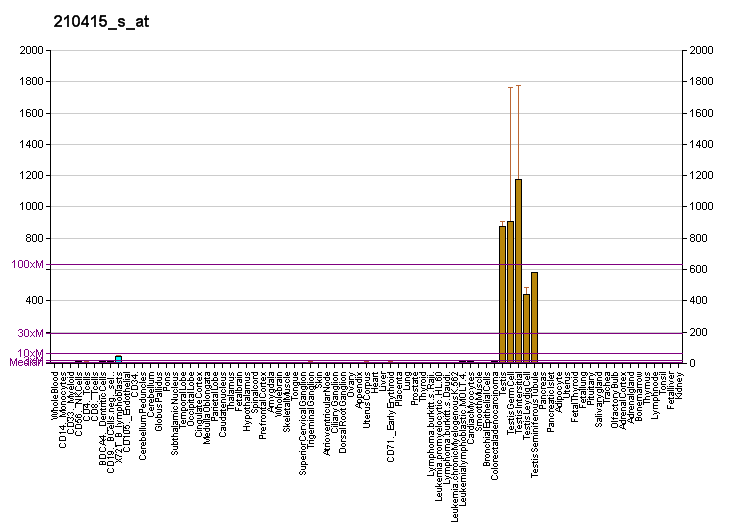
RNA expression pattern
| Bgee | Human / Mouse (ortholog); Top expressed in: sperm; left testis; right testis; right hemisphere of cerebellum; right uterine tube; anterior pituitary; stromal cell of endometrium; ventricular zone; sural nerve; tendon of biceps brachii / Top expressed in: seminiferous tubule; spermatid; spermatocyte; tail of embryo; zygote; secondary oocyte; primitive streak; cerebellar cortex; renal corpuscle; neural layer of retina; More reference expression data |
| BioGPS | More reference expression data |
Gene ontology
| Molecular function | structural molecule activity; protein binding |
| Cellular component | cytoplasm; ciliary basal body; cytosol; cell projection; spindle pole; outer dense fiber; ciliary transition fiber; microtubule organizing center; centriole; microtubule; cytoskeleton; nucleus; centrosome; cilium; motile cilium; sperm flagellum; centriolar subdistal appendage |
| Biological process | cell differentiation; multicellular organism development; G2/M transition of mitotic cell cycle; spermatogenesis; spermatid development; regulation of cilium assembly; ciliary basal body-plasma membrane docking; regulation of G2/M transition of mitotic cell cycle; protein localization; centriole-centriole cohesion; cilium organization |
Sources:Amigo / QuickGO
Orthologs
| Species | Human | Mouse |
| Entrez | 4957 | 18286 |
| Ensembl | ENSG00000136811 | ENSMUSG00000026790 |
| UniProt | Q5BJF6 | A3KGV1 |
| RefSeq (mRNA) | NM_001242352; NM_001242353; NM_001242354; NM_002540; NM_153432 NM_153433; NM_153435; NM_153436; NM_153437; NM_153439; NM_153440; NM_001351577; NM_001351578; NM_001351579; NM_001351580; NM_001351581; NM_001351582; NM_001351583; NM_001351584; NM_001351585; NM_001351586; NM_001351587; NM_001351588 | NM_001113213; NM_001113214; NM_001177659; NM_001177661; NM_013615 NM_001355136; NM_001355137; NM_001355138; NM_001369060; NM_001374179; NM_001374180; NM_001374181; NM_001374182 |
| RefSeq (protein) | NP_001229281; NP_001229282; NP_001229283; NP_002531; NP_702910 NP_702911; NP_702913; NP_702914; NP_702915; NP_702917; NP_702918; NP_001338506; NP_001338507; NP_001338508; NP_001338509; NP_001338510; NP_001338511; NP_001338512; NP_001338513; NP_001338514; NP_001338515; NP_001338516; NP_001338517 | NP_001106684; NP_001106685; NP_001171130; NP_001171132; NP_038643 NP_001342065; NP_001342066; NP_001342067; NP_001355989; NP_001361108; NP_001361109; NP_001361110; NP_001361111 |
| Location (UCSC) | Chr 9: 128.46 – 128.5 Mb | Chr 2: 29.78 – 29.82 Mb |
| PubMed search |
- Wikidata
| View/Edit Human | View/Edit Mouse |

Outer dense fiber protein 2, also known as cenexin, is a protein that in humans is encoded by the ODF2 gene.

The outer dense fibers are cytoskeletal structures that surround the axoneme in the middle piece and principal piece of the sperm tail. The fibers function in maintaining the elastic structure and recoil of the sperm tail as well as in protecting the tail from shear forces during epididymal transport and ejaculation. Defects in the outer dense fibers lead to abnormal sperm morphology and infertility. This gene encodes one of the major outer dense fiber proteins. Multiple protein isoforms are encoded by transcript variants of this gene; however, not all isoforms and variants have been fully described.
