= Microtubule nucleation =

Filament Formation

In cell biology, microtubule nucleation is the process that initiates the formation of microtubules. These filaments of the cytoskeleton typically form through polymerization of α- and β-tubulin dimers, the basic building blocks of the microtubule, which initially interact to nucleate a seed from which the filament elongates.

Microtubule nucleation occurs spontaneously in vitro, with solutions of purified tubulin giving rise to full-length polymers. The tubulin dimers that make up the polymers have an intrinsic capacity to self-aggregate and assemble into cylindrical tubes, provided there is an adequate supply of guanosine triphosphate (GTP). The kinetics barriers of such a process, however, mean that the rate at which microtubules spontaneously nucleate is relatively low.

== Role of γ-tubulin and the γ-tubulin ring complex (γ-TuRC) ==
In vivo, cells get around this kinetic barrier by using various proteins to aid microtubule nucleation. The primary pathway by which microtubule nucleation is assisted requires the action of a third type of tubulin, γ-tubulin, which is distinct from the α and β subunits that compose the microtubules themselves. The γ-tubulin combines with several other associated proteins to form a conical structure known as the γ-tubulin ring complex (γ-TuRC). This complex, with its 13-fold symmetry, acts as a scaffold or template for α/β tubulin dimers during the nucleation process—speeding up the assembly of the ring of 13 protofilaments that make up the growing microtubule. The γ-TuRC also acts as a cap of the (−) end while the microtubule continues growth from its (+) end. This cap provides both stability and protection to the microtubule (-) end from enzymes that could lead to its depolymerization, while also inhibiting (-) end growth.

== Nucleation from microtubule organizing centers ==
The γ-TuRC is typically found as the core functional unit in a microtubule organizing center (MTOC), such as the centrosome in some animal cells or the spindle pole bodies in fungi and algae. The γ-TuRCs in the centrosome nucleate an array of microtubules in interphase, which extend their (+)-ends radially outwards into the cytoplasm towards the periphery of the cell. Among its other functions, this radial array is used by microtubule-based motor proteins to transport various cargoes, such as vesicles, to the cell membrane.

The centrosome is the most common MTOC for multipotent cells in animals, with differentiated tissues utilising a wide variety of non-centrosomal MTOCs.

== Non-centrosomal MTOCs ==
In animal cells undergoing mitosis, a similar radial array is generated from two MTOCs called the spindle poles, which produce the bipolar mitotic spindle. Some cells however, such as those of higher plants and oocytes, lack distinct MTOCs and microtubules are nucleated via a non-centrosomal pathway. Other cells, such as neurons, skeletal muscle cells, and epithelial cells, which do have MTOCs, possess arrays of microtubules not associated with a centrosome. These non-centrosomal microtubule arrays can take on various geometries—such as those leading to the long, slender shape of a myotube, or the fine protrusions of an axon, or the strongly polarized domains of an epithelial cell.

In epithelial cells, CAMSAP3 acts as the non-centrosomal MTOC, and is localised to the apical membrane of the cell. Microtubules grow from this domain in parallel lines, giving the cell its rectangular shape.

The early cells of the pre-implantation mouse embryo utilise a unique non-centrosomal MTOC, in the form of an interphase microtubule bridge joining sister cells. This interphase bridge organises the microtubules of both cells, and uses CAMSAP3 to bind microtubule minus ends.

In the cortical array of plants, as well as in the axons of neurons, it is theorised that microtubules nucleate from existing microtubules via the action of severing enzymes such as katanin. Akin to the action of cofilin in generating actin filament arrays, the severing of microtubules by MAPs creates new plus (+) ends from which microtubules can grow. In this fashion, dynamic arrays of microtubules can be generated without the aid of the γ-TuRC.

== Branching MT nucleation ==
Studies using Xenopus egg extracts have identified a novel form of microtubule nucleation that generates fan-like branching arrays, in which new microtubules grow at an angle off of older microtubules. These branching microtubules maintain the same polarity as their mother microtubules, and their assembly involves the binding of non-centrosomal γ-TuRCs to the sides of existing microtubules through the augmin complex. This method of microtubule-dependent microtubule nucleation leads to rapid amplification in microtubule density.

Branching MT nucleation has been observed in numerous organisms both in the plant and animal kingdoms. Through use of TIRF microscopy, researchers have visually observed the nucleation of branching microtubules in Drosophila cells during the formation of the mitotic spindle. Five proteins in Drosophila (DGT2 through DGT6) have been identified that are necessary and responsible for facilitating the localization of γ-tubulin to existing MTs and are not associated with its localization at the centrosome.

== Role of Microtubule-Associated Proteins (MAPs) ==
Though the γ-TuRC is the primary protein used to nucleate microtubules, it is not the only protein that acts as a nucleation factor. Several other MAPs assist the γ-TuRC with the nucleation process, while others nucleate microtubules independently of γ-TuRC. In the branching nucleation described above, the addition of TPX2 to the egg extracts led to a dramatic increase in nucleation events—while in other studies, the protein XMAP215, in vitro, nucleated microtubule asters with its depletion in vivo reducing nucleation potential of centrosomes. The microtubule-binding protein doublecortin, in vitro, nucleates microtubules—acting by binding to the side rather than the end of growing microtubules. Thus, there may be a family of nucleation factor proteins in cells that use a variety of mechanisms to lower the energetic cost of nucleating microtubules. Recent studies have provided evidence towards the concept that the promotion of microtubule nucleation is possible with a combination of α- and β-tubulin dimers and the aforementioned MAP TPX2, even in the absence of γ-TuRC.

Several proteins are involved in formatting the γ-TuRC and temporal and spatial control of microtubule nucleation. These include, for example, coiled-coil proteins with structural functions and regulatory proteins, such as components of the Ran cycle. NEDD1 recruits the γ-TuRC to the centrosome by binding to γ-tubulin.
