= Centriole =

Organelle in eukaryotic cells

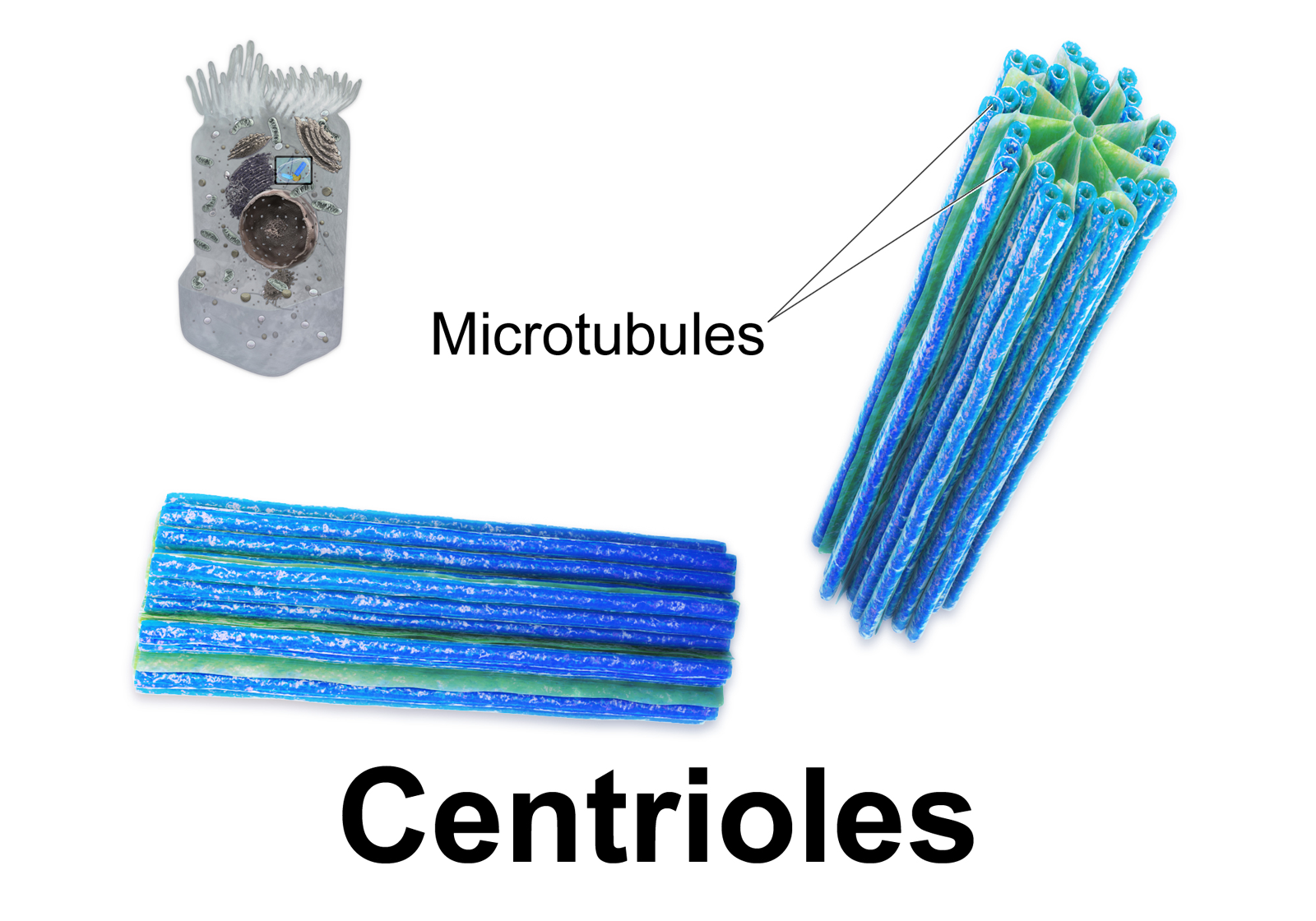
3D rendering of centrioles showing the triplets

In cell biology a centriole is a cylindrical organelle composed mainly of a protein called tubulin. Centrioles are found in most eukaryotic cells, but are not present in conifers (Pinophyta), flowering plants (angiosperms) and most fungi, and are only present in the male gametes of charophytes, bryophytes, seedless vascular plants, cycads, and Ginkgo. A bound pair of centrioles, surrounded by a highly ordered mass of dense material, called the pericentriolar material (PCM), makes up a structure called a centrosome.

Centrioles are typically made up of nine sets of short microtubule triplets, arranged in a cylinder. Deviations from this structure include crabs and Drosophila melanogaster embryos, with nine doublets, and Caenorhabditis elegans sperm cells and early embryos, with nine singlets. Additional proteins include centrin, cenexin and tektin.

Centrioles are involved in the formation of cilia during interphase, as well as in organizing the aster and mitotic spindle during cell division.

== History ==
The centrosome was discovered jointly by Walther Flemming in 1875 and Edouard Van Beneden in 1876. Edouard Van Beneden made the first observation of centrosomes as composed of two orthogonal centrioles in 1883. Theodor Boveri introduced the term "centrosome" in 1888 and the term "centriole" in 1895. The basal body was named by Theodor Wilhelm Engelmann in 1880. The pattern of centriole duplication was first worked out independently by Étienne de Harven and Joseph G. Gall c. 1950.

== Role in cell division ==
A mother and daughter centriole, attached orthogonally

Centrioles are involved in the organization of the mitotic spindle and in the completion of cytokinesis. Centrioles were previously thought to be required for the formation of a mitotic spindle in animal cells. However, more recent experiments have demonstrated that cells whose centrioles have been removed via laser ablation can still progress through the G_{1} stage of interphase before centrioles can be synthesized later in a de novo fashion. Additionally, mutant flies lacking centrioles develop normally, although the adult flies' cells lack flagella and cilia and as a result, they die shortly after birth. The centrioles can self replicate during cell division.

== Cellular organization ==
Centrioles are a key component of centrosomes, which are the cell's primary microtubule-organizing centers (MTOCs) and play a central role in organizing the cytoplasmic microtubule network. Through this role, centrioles contribute to nuclear positioning and the spatial arrangement of the cell.

== Fertility ==
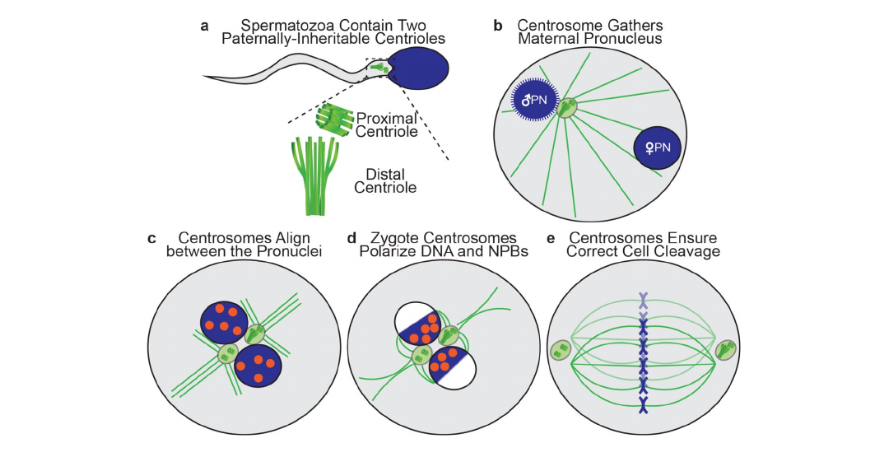
Sperm-derived centrioles in the human zygote contribute to centrosome formation, which organizes the microtubule network required for pronuclear migration and spindle formation during early embryonic divisions.

Sperm centrioles are important for two functions: formation of the sperm flagellum and sperm motility, and development of the embryo after fertilization. In many organisms, the sperm contributes one or more centriole-like structures to the zygote that participate in the formation of the centrosome during early embryonic development. The number and structure of these sperm-derived centrioles vary across species. For example, in humans, the oocyte is acentriolar, and the sperm donates two structurally distinct centrioles: the proximal centriole (PC) and the distal centriole (DC), which contribute to formation of the first centrosome in the zygote. The centrosome formed from these sperm-derived centrioles organizes the microtubule network required for pronuclear migration and mitotic spindle assembly during early embryonic divisions.

== Ciliogenesis ==
In flagellates and ciliates, the position of the flagellum or cilium is determined by the mother centriole, which becomes the basal body. An inability of cells to use centrioles to make functional flagella and cilia has been linked to a number of genetic and developmental diseases. In particular, the inability of centrioles to properly migrate prior to ciliary assembly has recently been linked to Meckel–Gruber syndrome.

== Animal development ==
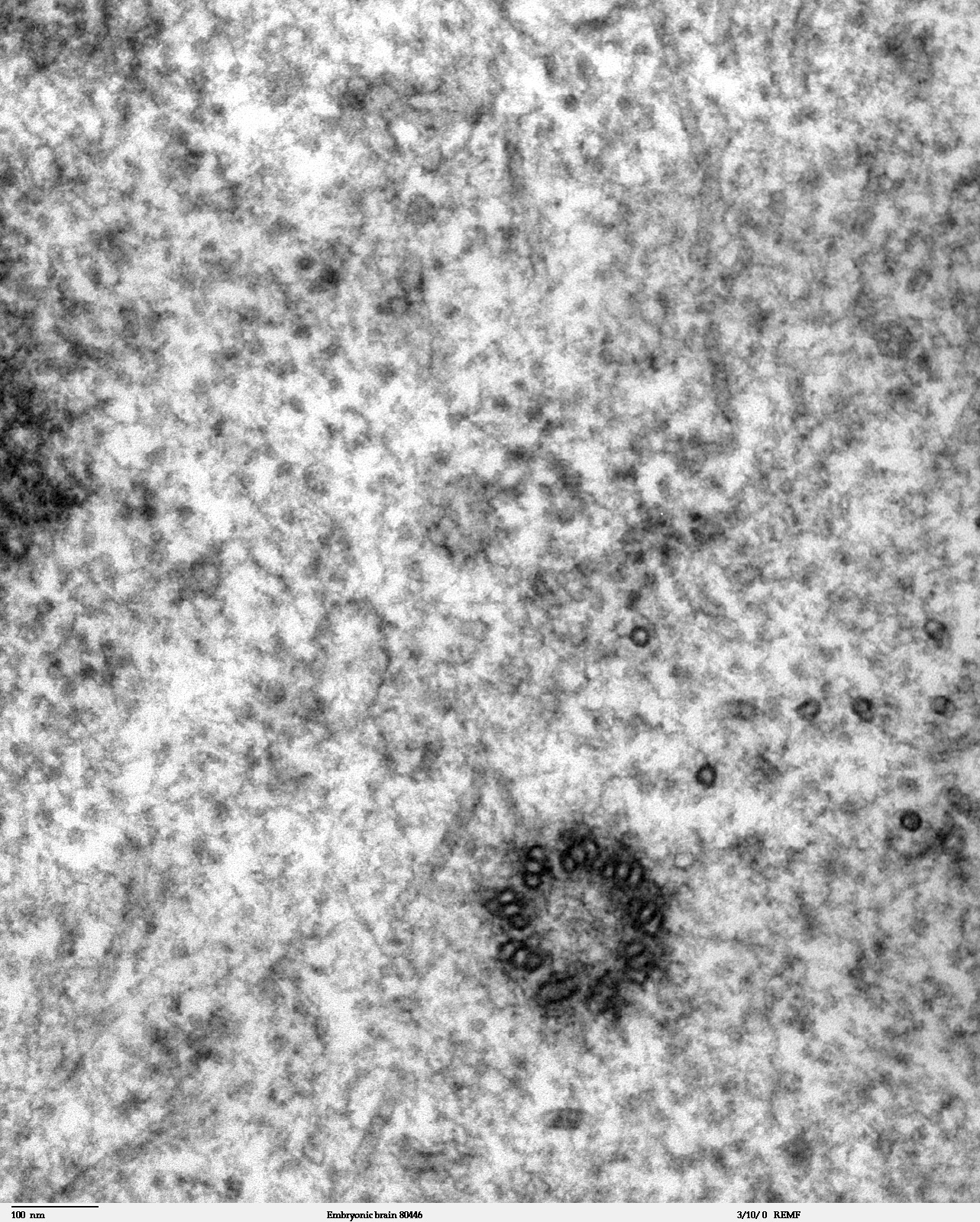
Electron micrograph of a centriole from a mouse embryo.

Proper orientation of cilia via centriole positioning toward the posterior of embryonic node cells is critical for establishing left-right asymmetry, during mammalian development.

== Centriole duplication ==
Prior to DNA replication, cells contain two centrioles: an older mother centriole and a younger daughter centriole. During S phase of the cell cycle, a procentriole forms at the proximal end of each pre-existing centriole and begins to elongate, and continues elongation during the subsequent G2 and M phases. After duplication, each newly formed centriole remains orthogonally attached to its parent centriole, forming two centriole pairs within a single centrosome.

During mitosis, the centrosome separates into two centrosomes, each containing one centriole pair that contributes to formation of the spindle poles. Each daughter cell inherits one of these mother-daughter centriole pairs. The mother centriole contains radiating appendages at the distal end of its long axis and is attached to the daughter centriole at its proximal end. At mitotic exit, the mother and daughter centrioles disengage during a process dependent on the separase enzyme. Centriole duplication is coordinated with DNA replication and is tightly regulated to occur only once per cell cycle.

== Origin ==
LECA, the last common ancestor of all eukaryotes was a ciliated cell with centrioles. Some lineages of eukaryotes, such as land plants, do not have centrioles except in their motile male gametes. Centrioles are completely absent from all cells of conifers and flowering plants, which do not have ciliate or flagellate gametes. It is unclear if the last common ancestor had one or two cilia. Important genes such as those coding for centrins, required for centriole growth, are only found in eukaryotes, and not in bacteria or archaea.

== Etymology and pronunciation ==
The word centriole (/ˈsɛntrioʊl/) uses combining forms of centri- and -ole, yielding "little central part", which describes a centriole's typical location near the center of the cell.

== Atypical centrioles ==
Typical centrioles are made of 9 triplets of microtubules organized with radial symmetry. Centrioles can vary the number of microtubules and can be made of 9 doublets of microtubules (as in Drosophila melanogaster) or 9 singlets of microtubules as in C. elegans. Atypical centrioles are centrioles that do not have microtubules, such as the Proximal Centriole-Like found in D. melanogaster sperm, or that have microtubules with no radial symmetry, such as in the distal centriole of human spermatozoon. Atypical centrioles may have evolved at least eight times independently during vertebrate evolution and may evolve in the sperm after internal fertilization evolves.

It wasn't clear why the centriole became atypical until recently. The atypical distal centriole forms a dynamic basal complex (DBC) that, together with other structures in the sperm neck, facilitates a cascade of internal sliding that couples tail beating with head kinking. The atypical distal centriole's properties suggest that it evolved into a transmission system that couples the sperm tail motors to the whole sperm, thereby enhancing sperm function.
