= Centrosome =

Cell organelle in animal cell helping in cell division

Cell biology
- centrosome
- Components of a typical centrosome: 1. Centriole; 2. Mother centriole 3. Daughter centriole 4. Distal ends 5. Distal appendages 6. Subdistal appendages 7. Proximal ends 8. Microtubule triplets 9. Interconnecting fibers 10. Microtubules; 11. Pericentriolar material

The centrosome (Latin centrum 'centre' + Greek sōma 'body') (archaically cytocentre) is a non-membrane bounded organelle in the animal cell that serves as the main microtubule organizing centre (MTOC) and a regulator of cell-cycle progression. The centrosome provides structure for the cell. It is thought to have evolved only in the metazoan lineage of eukaryotic cells. Fungi and plants lack centrosomes and therefore use other structures to organize their microtubules. Although the centrosome has a key role in efficient mitosis in animal cells, it is not essential in certain fly and flatworm species.

In non-rodent mammals the sperm contributes the major part of the centrosome, the centrioles. Centrosomes are composed of two centrioles arranged at right angles to each other, and surrounded by a dense, highly structured mass of proteins termed the pericentriolar material (PCM). The PCM contains proteins responsible for microtubule nucleation and anchoring — including γ-tubulin, pericentrin and ninein. In general, each centriole of the centrosome is based on a nine-triplet microtubule assembled in a cartwheel structure, and contains centrin, cenexin and tektin. In many cell types, the centrosome is replaced by a cilium during cellular differentiation. However, once the cell starts to divide, the cilium is replaced again by the centrosome.

== History ==
The centrosome was discovered jointly by Walther Flemming in 1875 and Edouard Van Beneden in 1876, and later described and named in 1888 by Theodor Boveri.

== Functions ==
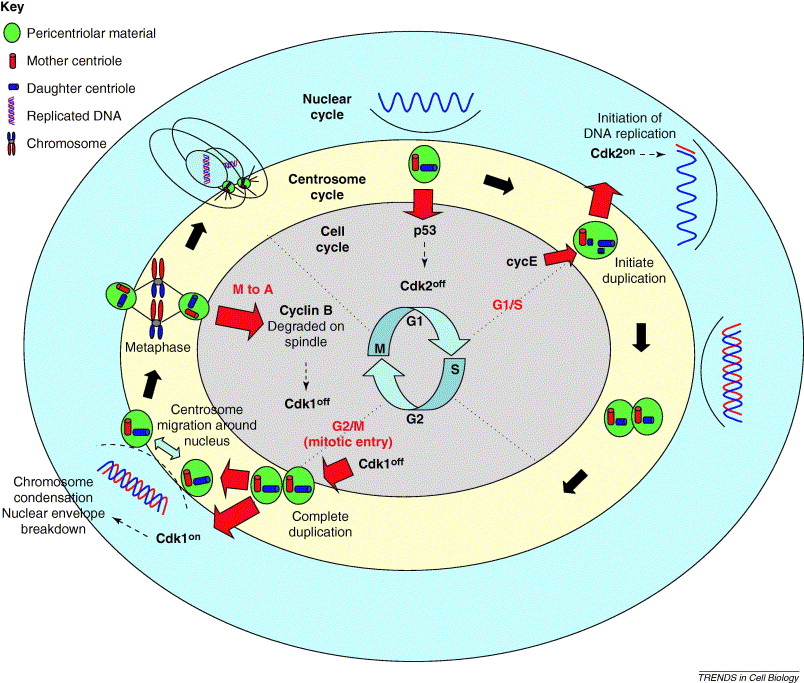
Role of the centrosome in cell cycle progression

Centrosomes are associated with the nuclear membrane during the prophase stage of the cell cycle. During mitosis, the nuclear membrane breaks down, and the centrosome-nucleated microtubules can interact with the chromosomes to build the mitotic spindle.

The mother centriole, the older of the two in the centriole pair, also has a central role in making cilia and flagella.

The centrosome is copied only once per cell cycle, so that each daughter cell inherits one centrosome, containing two structures called centrioles. The centrosome replicates during the S phase of the cell cycle. During the prophase in the process of cell division called mitosis, the centrosomes migrate to opposite poles of the cell. The mitotic spindle then forms between the two centrosomes. Upon division, each daughter cell receives one centrosome. Aberrant numbers of centrosomes in a cell have been associated with cancer. Doubling of a centrosome is similar to DNA replication in two respects: the semiconservative nature of the process and the action of CDK2 as a regulator of the process. But the processes are essentially different in that centrosome doubling does not occur by template reading and assembly. The mother centriole just aids in the accumulation of materials required for the assembly of the daughter centriole.

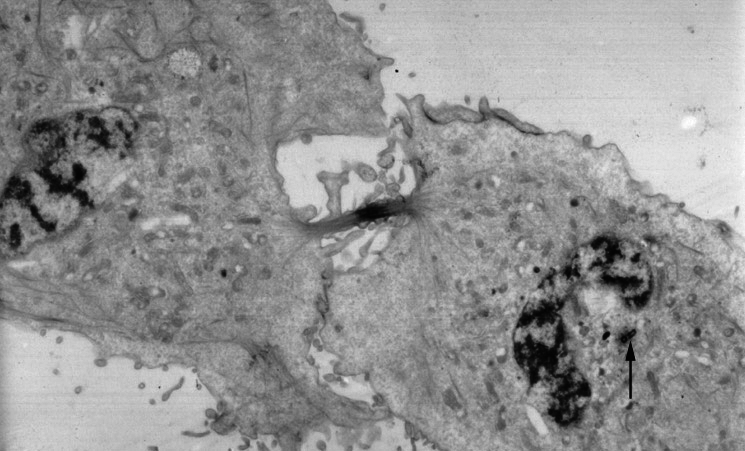
Centrosome (shown by arrow) next to nucleus

Centrioles, however, are not required for the progression of mitosis. When the centrioles are irradiated by a laser, mitosis proceeds normally with a morphologically normal spindle. Moreover, development of the fruit fly Drosophila is largely normal when centrioles are absent due to a mutation in a gene required for their duplication. In the absence of the centrioles, the microtubules of the spindle are focused by motors, allowing the formation of a bipolar spindle. Many cells can completely undergo interphase without centrioles.

Unlike centrioles, centrosomes are required for survival of the organism. Cells without centrosomes lack radial arrays of astral microtubules. They are also defective in spindle positioning and in the ability to establish a central localization site in cytokinesis. The function of centrosomes in this context is hypothesized to ensure the fidelity of cell division, because it greatly increases the efficacy. Some cell types arrest in the following cell cycle when centrosomes are absent. This is not a universal phenomenon.

When the nematode C. elegans egg is fertilized, the sperm delivers a pair of centrioles. These centrioles will form the centrosomes, which will direct the first cell division of the zygote, and this will determine its polarity. It's not yet clear whether the role of the centrosome in polarity determination is microtubule-dependent or independent.

In human reproduction, the sperm supplies the centriole that creates the centrosome and microtubule system of the zygote. Some failures in fertilization are centrosome-related.

== Centrosome alterations in cancer cells ==
Theodor Boveri, in 1914, described centrosome aberrations in cancer cells. This initial observation was subsequently extended to many types of human tumors. Centrosome alterations in cancer can be divided in two subgroups — i.e., structural or numeric aberrations — yet both can be found simultaneously in a tumor.

=== Structural aberrations ===
Usually, structural aberrations appear due to uncontrolled expression of centrosome components, or due to post-translational modifications (such as phosphorylations) that are not adequate for the components. These modifications may produce variations in centrosome size (usually too large, due to an excess of pericentriolar material). In addition, because centrosomal proteins have a tendency to form aggregates, centrosome-related bodies (CRBs) are often observed in ectopic places. Both enlarged centrosomes and CRBs are similar to the centrosomal structures observed in tumors. Even more, these structures can be induced in culture cells by overexpression of specific centrosomal proteins, such as CNap-1 or Nlp. These structures may look very similar, yet detailed studies reveal that they may present very different properties, depending on their proteic composition. For instance, their capacity to incorporate γ-TuRC complexes (see also: γ-tubulin) can be very variable, and so their capacity to nucleate microtubules therefore affects the shape, polarity and motility of implicated tumor cells in different ways.

=== Numeric aberrations ===
The presence of an inadequate number of centrosomes is very often linked to the appearance of genome instability and the loss of tissue differentiation. However, the method to count the centrosome number (with two centrioles to each centrosome) is often not very precise, because it is frequently assessed using fluorescence microscopy, which does not have high enough optical resolution to resolve centrioles that are very close to each other. Nevertheless, it is clear that the presence of an excess of centrosomes is a common event in human tumors. It has been observed that loss of the tumor-suppressor p53 produces superfluous centrosomes, as well as deregulating other proteins implicated in cancer formation in humans, such as BRCA1 and BRCA2. (For references, see.) An excess of centrosomes can be generated by very different mechanisms: specific reduplication of the centrosome, cytokinesis failure during cell division (generating an increase in chromosome number), cell fusion (such as in cases of infection by specific viruses) or de novo generation of centrosomes. At this point, there is insufficient information to know how prevalent these mechanisms are in vivo, but it is possible that the increase in centrosome numbers due to a failure during cell division might be more frequent than appreciated, because many "primary" defects in one cell (deregulation of the cell cycle, defective DNA or chromatin metabolism, failure in the spindle checkpoint, etc.) would generate a failure in cell division, an increase in ploidy and an increase in centrosome numbers as a "secondary" effect.

== Evolution ==
The evolutionary history of the centrosome and the centriole has been traced for some of the signature genes — e.g., the centrins. Centrins participate in calcium signaling and are required for centriole duplication. There exist two main subfamilies of centrins, both of which are present in the early-branching eukaryote Giardia intestinalis. Centrins have therefore been present in the common ancestor of eukaryotes. Conversely, they have no recognizable homologs in archea and bacteria and are thus part of the "eukaryotic signature genes". Although there are studies on the evolution of the centrins and centrioles, no studies have been published on the evolution of the pericentriolar material.

It is evident that some parts of the centrosome are highly diverged in the model species Drosophila melanogaster and Caenorhabditis elegans. For example, both species have lost one of the centrin subfamilies that are usually associated with centriole duplication. Drosophila melanogaster mutants that lack centrosomes can even develop to morphologically normal adult flies, which then die shortly after birth because their sensory neurons lack cilia. Thus, these flies have evolved functionally redundant machinery, which is independent of the centrosomes.

== Associated nucleotides ==
Research in 2006 indicated that centrosomes from Atlantic surf clam eggs contain RNA sequences. The sequences identified were found in "few to no" other places in the cell, and do not appear in existing genome databases. One identified RNA sequence contains a putative RNA polymerase, leading to the hypothesis of an RNA-based genome within the centrosome. However, subsequent research has shown that centrosome do not contain their own DNA-based genomes. While it was confirmed that RNA molecules associate with centrosomes, the sequences have still been found within the nucleolus, and associated with an organelle called the nucleolinus. Furthermore, centrosomes can form de novo after having been removed (e.g., by laser irradiation) from normal cells.
