= Neuroblastoma breaking point family =

Family of mammalian genes involved in brain evolution

The neuroblastoma breaking point family (NBPF) is a family of genes involved in neuronal development. The family is highly specific to primates, with minimal similarity or presence in other mammals and no presence in other animals, and its genes' content has been subject to a very high number of duplications in humans. It was described by Vandepoele et al. in 2005 and named as such because NBPF1 was found to be broken by a chromosomal translocation in a neuroblastoma patient.

The NBPF genes contain multiple copies of the Olduvai domain. A higher number of copies of this domain has been found to be correlated with brain size and autism severity, while a lower number of copies has been found to be correlated with schizophrenia severity. The only other gene known to have an Olduvai domain is myomegalin, which is believed to be the origin of the NBPF genes as it has orthologues in more basal mammals. Additionally, myomegalin is adjacent to many of the NBPF genes on chromosome 1q21. The first three genes are located at 1p36, while the next four are located at 1p12 and the next eleven at 1q21.

== Genes ==
- NBPF1
- NBPF2P
- NBPF3
- NBPF4
- NBPF5
- NBPF6
- NBPF7
- NBPF8
- NBPF9
- NBPF10
- NBPF11 (NBPF24)
- NBPF12
- NBPF13P
- NBPF14
- NBPF15 (NBPF16)
- NBPF17P (NBPF23)
- NBPF18P
- NBPF19
- NBPF20
- NBPF21P
- NBPF22P
- NBPF26

"P" indicates a pseudogene.

== See also ==
- 1q21.1 deletion syndrome
- 1q21.1 duplication syndrome
- Olduvai domain
