= NBPF8 =

Protein found in humans

Identifiers
- Aliases: NBPF8, NBPF8P, neuroblastoma breakpoint family member 8, NBPF member 8
- External IDs: OMIM: 613998; GeneCards: NBPF8

Gene location (Human)
Chr.	Chromosome 1 (human)
Band	1p11.2	Start	120,419,850 bp
Band	1p11.2	End	120,467,739 bp
RNA expression pattern
Bgee	Human / Mouse (ortholog); Top expressed in: right lobe of liver; right lobe of thyroid gland; left lobe of thyroid gland; right hemisphere of cerebellum; granulocyte; body of pancreas; left uterine tube; left ovary; right ovary; stromal cell of endometrium / n/a; More reference expression data
BioGPS	n/a
Orthologs
Databases	NCBI: entry; OMA: entry
Species	Human	Mouse
Entrez	728841	n/a
Ensembl	ENSG00000270231	n/a
UniProt	n a	n/a
RefSeq (mRNA)	NM_001037501	n/a
RefSeq (protein)	n/a	n/a
Location (UCSC)	Chr 1: 120.42 – 120.47 Mb	n/a
PubMed search		n/a
- Wikidata
View/Edit Human

Neuroblastoma breakpoint family member 8 (NBPF8) is a protein which, in Homo sapiens (humans), is encoded by the NBPF8 gene.

Figure 1. This is a conceptual translation of the NBPF8 mRNA and its corresponding protein. Above is a thumbnail of a PDF, so click into this document if in search of the full, annotated version of this conceptual translation.

== Gene ==
NBPF8 is a member of the neuroblastoma breakpoint family (NBPF), and it is located on the plus strand of human chromosome 1 at the location of 1p11.2. This gene contains 19 exons and spans 7,256 base pairs; however, its coding sequence spans 2,828 base pairs.

== mRNA ==
The mRNA of the NBPF8 Transcript Variant 1 includes 7,526 nucleotides, and this is the isoform that will be described in detail in this page. Additionally, there are two other isoforms of the NBPF8 that encode proteins which are NBPF8 Isoform X1 and NBPF8 Isoform X2 which span 6,826 nucleotides and 3,894 nucleotides, respectively. The non-protein coding isoforms of NBPF8 are NBPF8 Transcript Variant 2 and NBPF8 Transcript Variant 3 which span 7,360 nucleotides and 7,100 nucleotides, respectively.

== Protein ==
The NBPF8 protein encoded by NBPF8 Transcript Variant 1 contains 942 amino acids, has a molecular weight of 10.9kD, and an isoelectric point equal to 4.7. The two protein-coding isoforms mentioned previously, NBPF8 Isoform X1 and NBPF8 Isoform X2 encode 1,353 and 872 amino acids, respectively.

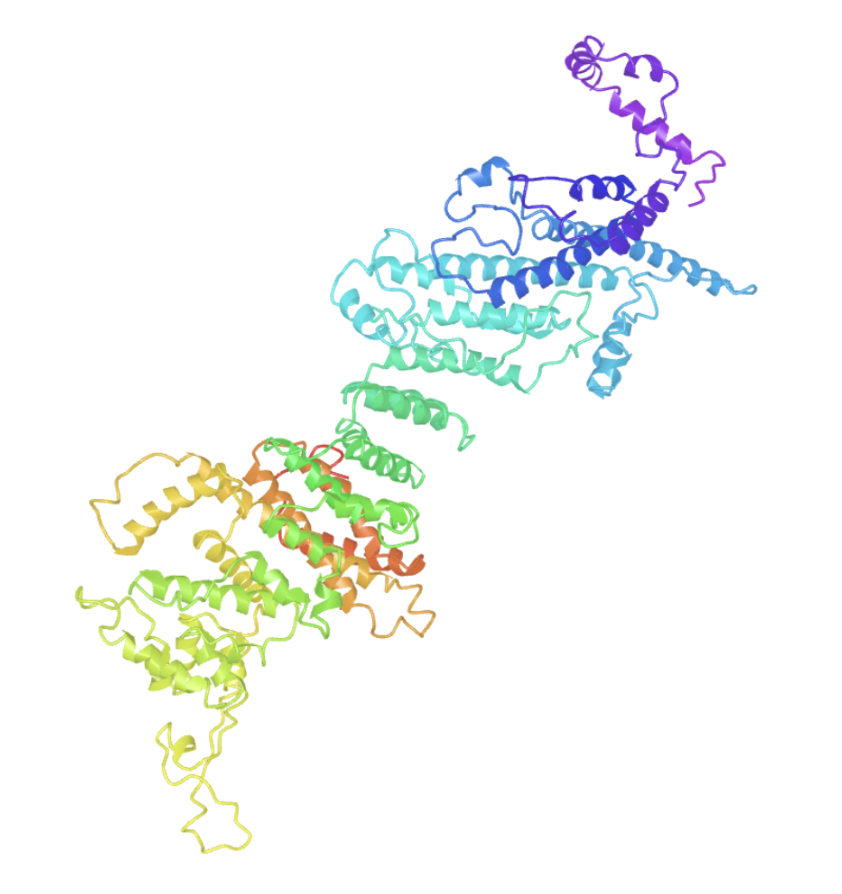
Figure 2. Tertiary structure of NBPF8 generated via I-TASSER Protein Structure Predictor and annotated via the use of iCn3D. Annotated via a rainbow (R-V); red represents the beginning of the protein and violet represents the end of the protein.

=== Compositional analysis ===
The NBPF8 protein in Homo sapiens has more glutamic acid and glutamine (amino acids) than the average protein while having less threonine than the typical protein.

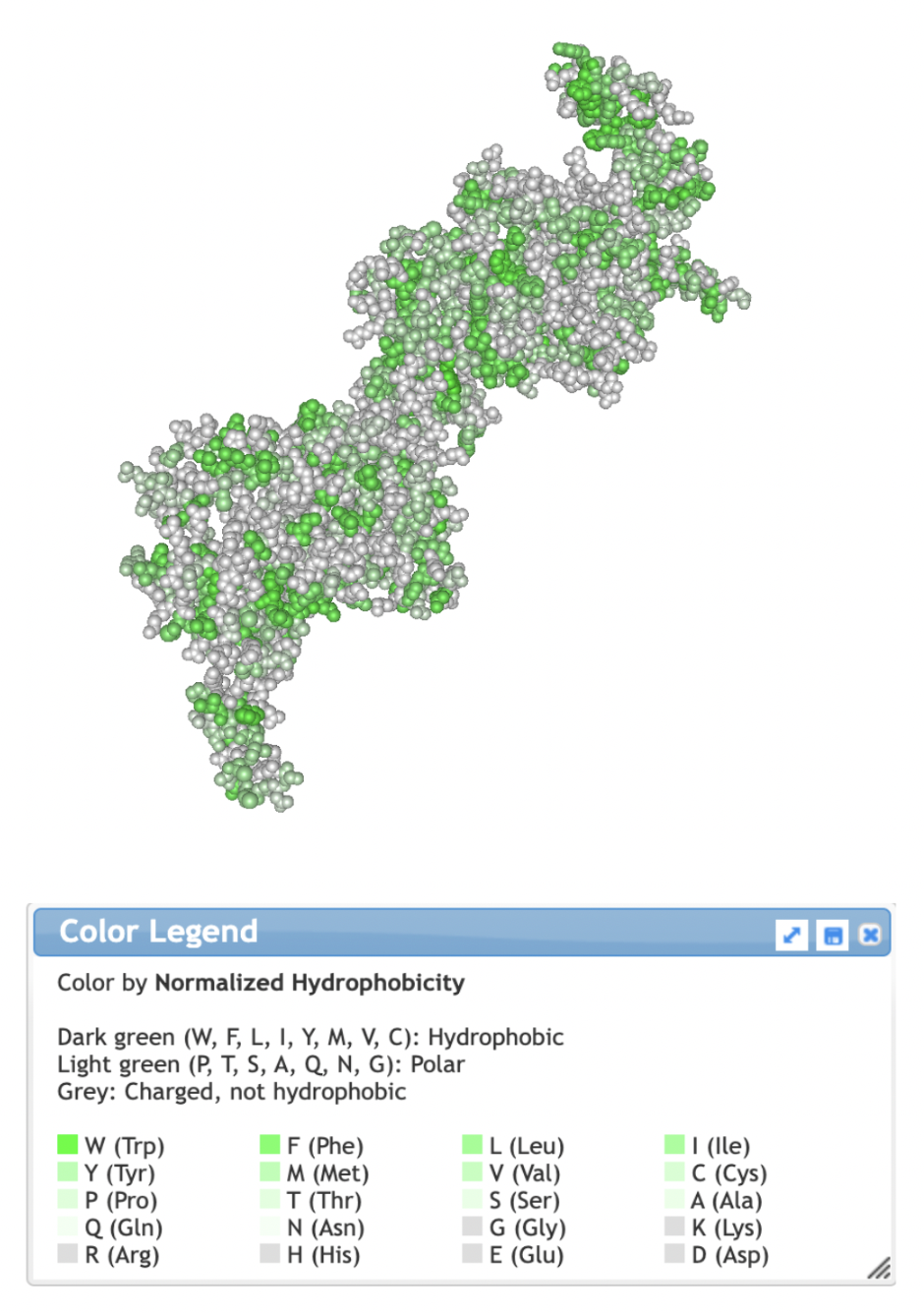
Figure 3. Tertiary structure of NBPF8 generated via I-TASSER Protein Structure Predictor and annotated for hydrophobicity via the use of iCn3D.

The NBPF8 protein in Aotus nancymaae, the furthest ortholog of the NBPF8 gene and protein from humans, also has more glutamic acid and glutamine (amino acids) than the average protein while having less threonine than the typical protein, therefore aligning with the NBPF8 protein in humans. However, the NBPF8 protein in this monkey has more variability in other amino acids which is not seen in the human protein.

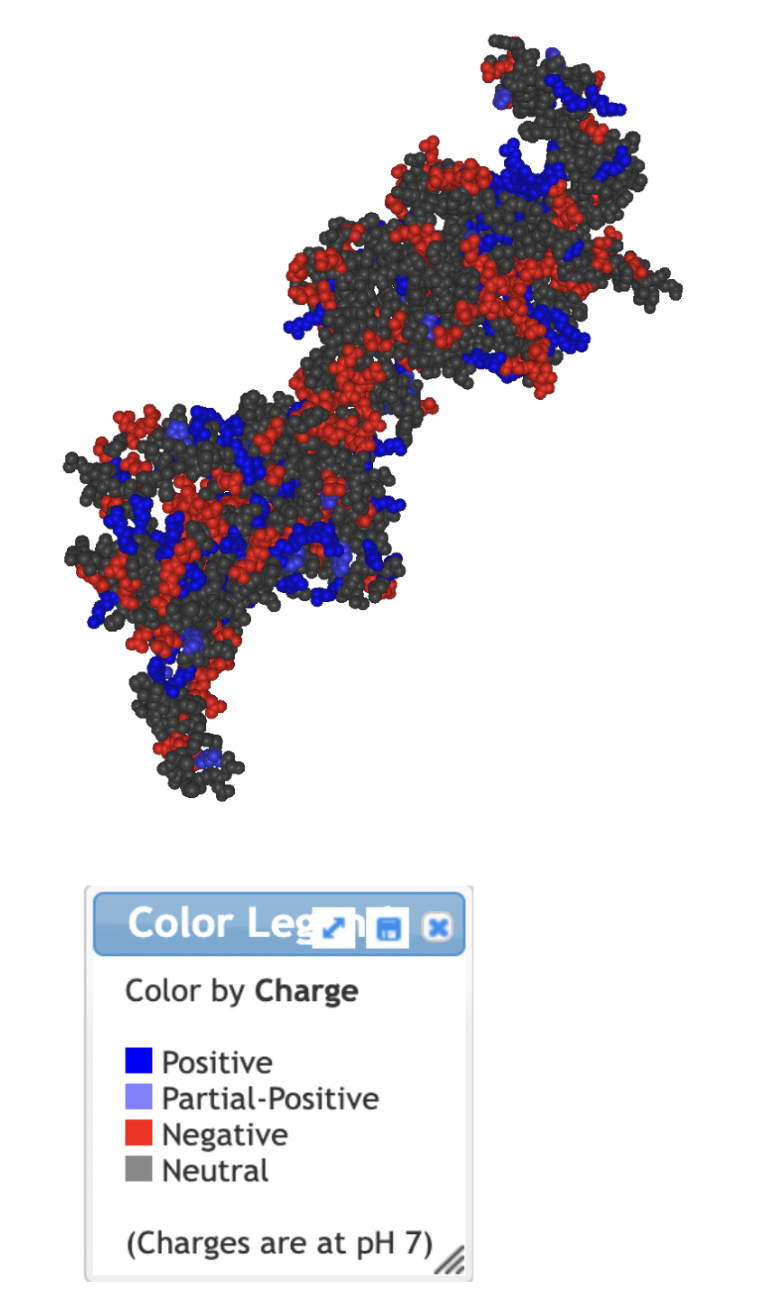
Figure 4. Tertiary structure of NBPF8 generated via I-TASSER Protein Structure Predictor and annotated for charge via the use of iCn3D.

=== Internal structures, domains and motifs ===
NBPF family is identified via repeated copies of DUF1220 protein domains, also known as an Olduvai domains. The sequences encoding these protein domains display the greatest human lineage-specific copy number increase of any coding region in the genome. Initial research on potential clinical significance via NCBI suggested that the Olduvai regions that characteristic of genes in the Neuroblastoma Breakpoint Family have been associated with autism, schizophrenia, cognitive disability, microcephaly, macrocephaly, congenital heart disease, congenital kidney and urinary tract anomalies, and neuroblastoma. Additionally, NCBI found that some of the members of the Neuroblastoma Breakpoint Family have been associated with cancer when expressed at higher or lower levels than typical expression.

=== Sub-cellular localization ===
NBPF8 is predicted to be intracellularly located with 0.9748 probability. However, its location within the cell is indeterminate.

=== Protein interactions ===
Table 1. Protein Interactions: Proteins that Interact with NBPF8.

Interactor with NBPF8	About the Interactor
NEK4	NIMA (Never in Mitosis Gene A) Related Kinase 4; This protein is a serine/threonine protein kinase required for a cell's regular entry into replicative senescence and is involved in cell cycle arrest; As for clinical applications, high expression of NEK4 is correlated with colorectal and lung cancer. Additionally, research has been done investigating NEK4 as a potential drug target for schizophrenia and bipolar I disorder.
CUL4B	Cullin 4B; This protein forms a complex that functions as an ubiquitin ligase to therefore catalyze the polyubiquitination of specific protein substrates in a cell.; As for clinical applications, CUL4B has been found to encourage the proliferation of, while inhibiting apoptosis of, osteosarcoma cells in humans.
EGFR	Epidermal Growth Factor Receptor; This protein is a transmembrane glycoprotein of which is a part of the protein kinase family. The actions of this protein, via inducing receptor dimerization and tyrosine autophosphorylation, lead to cell proliferation.; As for clinical applications, mutations are associated with lung cancer.
UBC	Ubiquitin C; Ubiquitination is associated with protein degradation, cell cycle regulation, DNA repair, kinase modification, endocytosis, and regulation of other cell signaling pathways.

== Expression and disease states ==
=== General expression ===
There exists a moderate, ubiquitous expression of NBPF8 in bodily tissues.

=== Disease states ===
Table 2. Table of the Results of Cytoplasmic Staining to Evaluate NBPF8's Expression in Cancer

Antibody Utilized	Type of Cancer	Type of Expression	Number of Patients
HPA038748	Colorectal Cancer	High Expression	10/11 Patients
HPA038748	Stomach Cancer	High/Medium Expression	7/9 Patients
HPA038748	Liver Cancer	High/Medium Expression	9/12 Patients
HPA058050	Liver Cancer	High/Medium Expression	9/12 Patients
HPA044023	Pancreatic Cancer	High/Medium Expression	7/10 Patients
HPA038748	Pancreatic Cancer	High/Medium Expression	7/11 Patients
HPA043692	Renal Cancer	High/Medium Expression	6/11 Patients
HPA044023	Cervical Cancer	High/Medium Expression	6/12 Patients
HPA038748	Melanoma	High/Medium Expression	6/12 Patients
HPA038748	Ovarian Cancer	High/Medium Expression	6/12 Patients

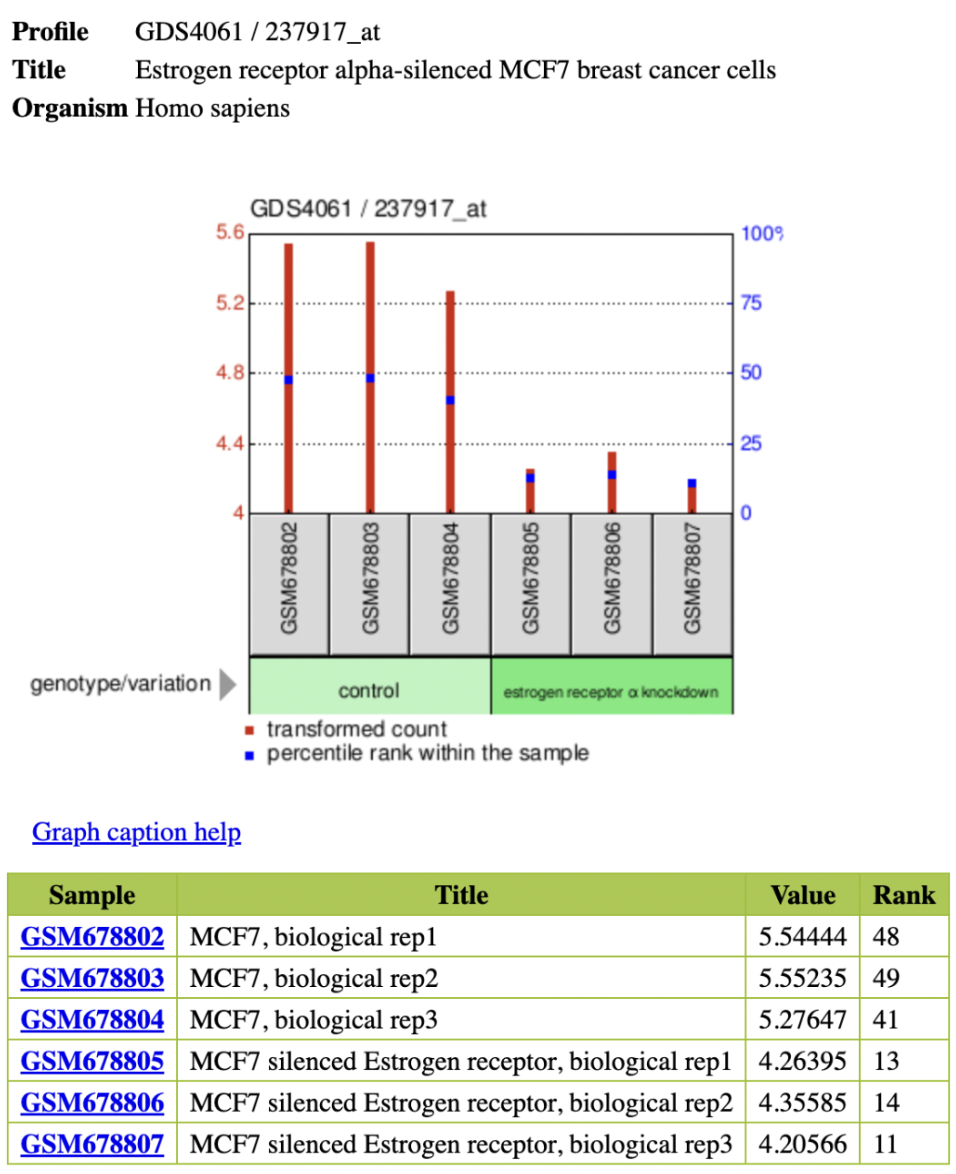
Figure 5. The expression of NBPF8 in MCF7 breast cancer cells with and without an estrogen receptor alpha knockdown. Depiction via NCBI GEO.

Analysis of Figure 5: Estrogen receptor alpha-silenced MCF-7 breast cancer cells

In Homo sapiens, the MCF7 breast cancer cell has a very high expression of NBPF8, arbitrarily with values of 5.54, 5.55, and 5.28, while, when there exists the knockdown of estrogen receptor alpha, the expression of NBPF8 falls to, arbitrarily, values of 4.26, 4.36, and 4.21. Although this difference may not seem drastic nor important, within the sample, this percentile rank of expression drops from 41 to 49% all the way down to 11-14% clearly indicating the prevalence of NBPF8 in MCF7 breast cancer cells. Estrogen receptor alpha is a transcription factor that binds to estrogen/estradiol to therefore send signals that stimulate the growth of breast cancer.

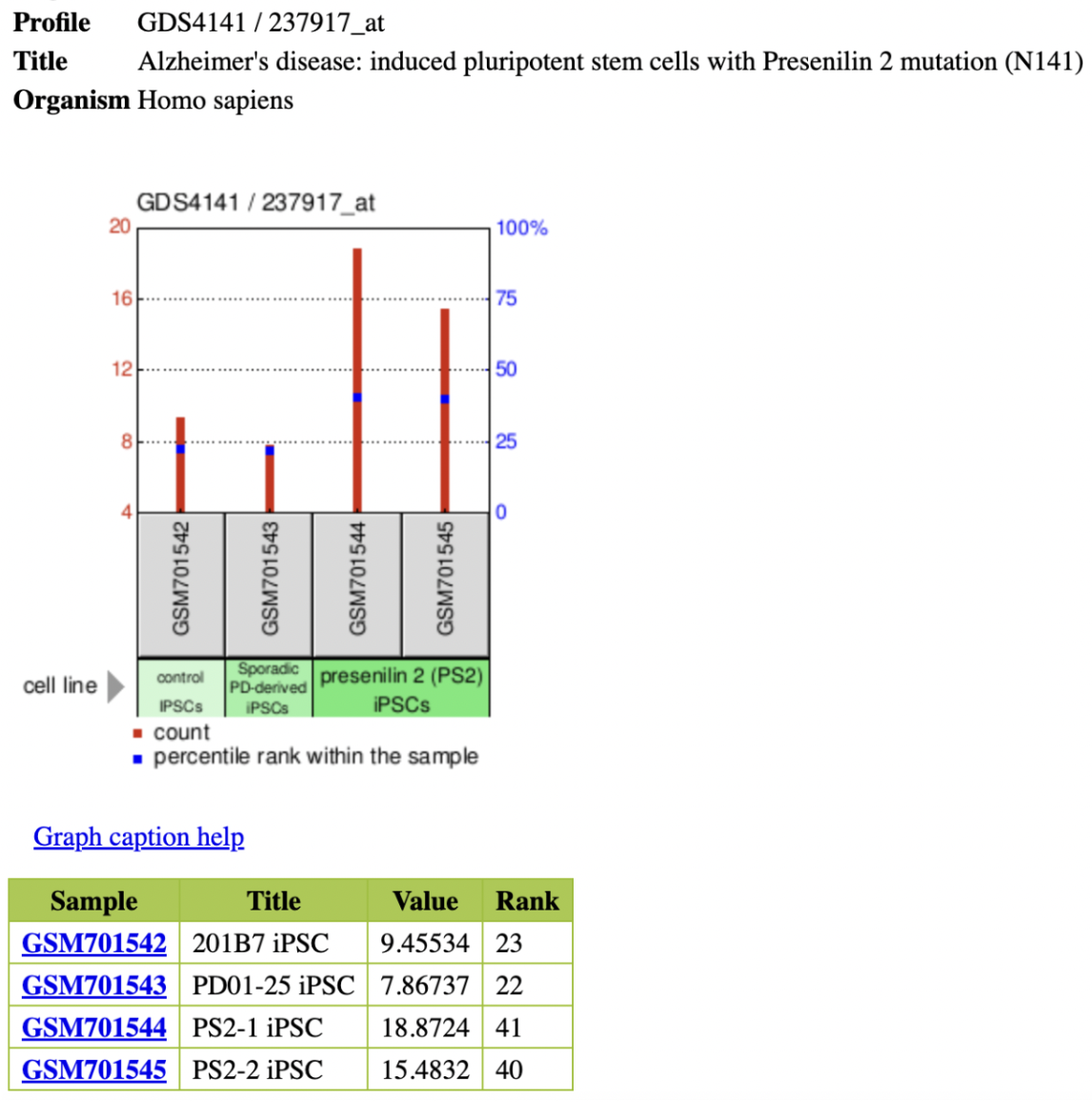
Figure 6. The expression of NBPF8 in induced pluripotent stem cells without a Presenilin 2 mutation, with a Presenilin 2 mutation, and specifically derived from somatic cells of those with sporadic Parkison's disease. Depiction via NCBI GEO.

Analysis of Figure 6: Alzheimer's disease: Induced pluripotent stem cells with Presenilin-2 mutation (N141)

In Homo sapiens, in induced pluripotent stem cells (iPSCs) that have not been experimentally manipulated, NBPF8 expression is relatively lower than both of the following conditions: when the iPSCs are derived from somatic cells of those with sporadic Parkinson's disease and the iPSCs with the presence of a Presenilin 2 (PS2) mutation. In the controlled group, the expression of NBPF8 had an arbitrary value of 9.46 at 23%, the study performed upon iPSCs derived from the somatic cells of those with sporadic Parkison's disease (non-hereditary Parkinson's disease) had an arbitrary value of 7.87 with a rank of 22%, and lastly, the iPSCs with the PS2 mutation, the expression of NBPF8 had arbitrary values of 18.87 and 15.48, with ranks of 41% and 40% respectively. This data says that the specific mutation in PS2 researched upon was N141; N141I, the Volga German mutation, was found to be linked to Alzheimer disease due to its altering of the metabolism of amyloid beta protein and human beta-amyloid precursor protein.

== Evolution ==
=== Paralogs ===
The NBPF8 gene is a part of a gene family, the neuroblastoma breakpoint family (which has 22 genes total), and therefore has many paralogs within this family. Outside of genes within the neuroblastoma breakpoint family, and excluding uncharacterized proteins, there is only one paralog associated with NBPF8 which is myomegalin; myomegalin isoform 16 has the highest percent identity of 32.94%. Something notable is that myomegalin has orthologs in sharks and rays (bony fish) which extends further back evolutionarily than NBPF8's orthologs; as a note, the neuroblastoma breakpoint family as a whole does not extend further evolutionarily than NBPF8 individually.

Table 3. Paralogs of NBPF8

Paralog's Name	Accession Number	Query Cover	Percent Identity to NBPF8	Percent Similarity to NBPF8
NBPF8	NP_001032590.2	100%	100%	100%
NBPF9 (Isoform 2)	NP_001032764.2	100%	97%	98%
NBPF15 (Isoform 1)	NP_001164226.1	99%	96%	97%
NBPF26 (Isoform 3 precursor)	NP_001382566.1	100%	94%	96%
NBPF10 (Isoform A)	NP_001289300.1	100%	94%	96%
NBPF14 (Isoform 2)	NP_001382560.1	100%	94%	96%
NBPF19	NP_001338294.1	99%	94%	96%
NBPF1 (Isoform 12)	NP_001392630.1	99%	94%	95%
NBPF20 (Isoform 1)	NP_001384140.1	99%	94%	96%
NBPF12	NP_001265070.1	100%	92%	95%
NBPF7	NP_001392671.1	100%	92%	95%
NBPF11 (Isoform B)	NP_001095133.3	98%	90%	93%
NBPF3 (Isoform 1)	NP_115640.1	100%	76%	84%
NBPF6 (Isoform X1)	XP_011540314.1	97%	56%	69%
NBPF4 (Isoform X5)	XP_054190561.1	97%	56%	69%
Myomegalin (Isoform 16)	NP_001382226.1	17%	33%	55%

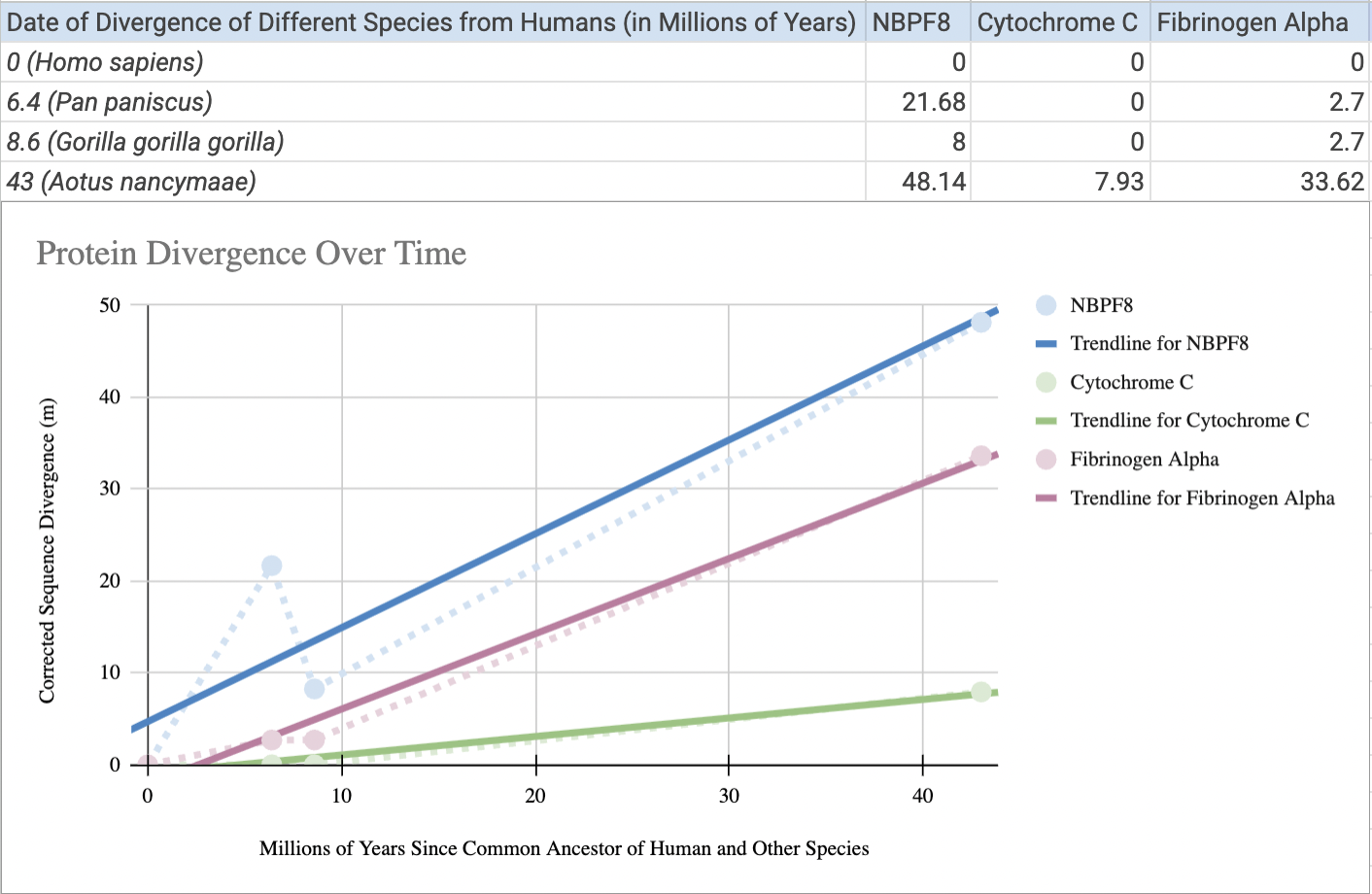
Figure 7. This is a graph, and corresponding table, of the rate that the NBPF8 protein diverges over time. This graph, and table, relate the NBPF8 protein, the Cytochrome C protein, and the Fibrinogen Alpha protein in humans in comparison to each of these respective proteins in different primates.

=== Orthologs ===
There are only direct orthologs of NBPF8 in primates which is consistent with the rest of the genes in the neuroblastoma breakpoint family; evolutionary speaking, the furthest species from humans (Homo sapiens) these orthologs of NBPF8 are found in is Aotus nancymaae (the Ma's night monkey). This protein has a date of divergence from the human lineage of 43 million years, therefore being the furthest ortholog of NBPF8 by over 34 million years. The following will depict what each of the orthologs is and what its three letter code followed by "_NBPF8" represents as these codes will to be used to depict which protein sequence is which in a more concise manner:

- Hsa_NBPF8: the NBPF8 protein found in Homo sapiens (the Human)
- Ppa_NBPF8: the NBPF8 protein found in Pan paniscus (the Pygmy chimpanzee)
- Ggo_NBPF8: the NBPF8 protein found in Gorilla gorilla gorilla (the Western lowland gorilla)
- Ana_NBPF8: the NBPF8 protein found in Aotus nancymaae (the Ma's night monkey)

Table 4. Orthologs of NBPF8

Genus and Species	Common Name	Taxonomic Group	Date of Divergence from the Human Lineage (units of millions of years ago: MYA)	Accession Number	Sequence Length (units of amino acids (aa))	Sequence Identity to Human Protein	Sequence Similarity to Human Protein	Query Cover
Homo sapiens	Human		0	NP_001032590.2	942	100%	100%	100%
Pan paniscus	Pygmy chimpanzee	Primates	6.4	XP_054958518.2	2628	81%	86%	100%
Gorilla gorilla gorilla	Western lowland gorilla	Primates	8.6	XP_063552414.1	1458	92%	95%	100%
Aotus nancymaae	Ma's night monkey	Primates	43	XP_021529833.2	276	62%	77%	57%
