= NBPF3 =

Protein found in humans

Identifiers
- Aliases: NBPF3, AE2, neuroblastoma breakpoint family member 3, NBPF member 3
- External IDs: OMIM: 612992; GeneCards: NBPF3

Gene location (Human)
Chr.	Chromosome 1 (human)
Band	1p36.12	Start	21,440,128 bp
Band	1p36.12	End	21,485,005 bp
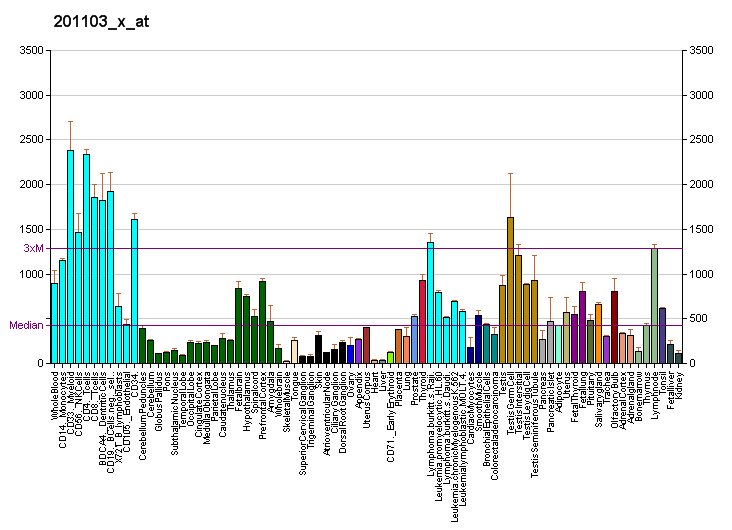

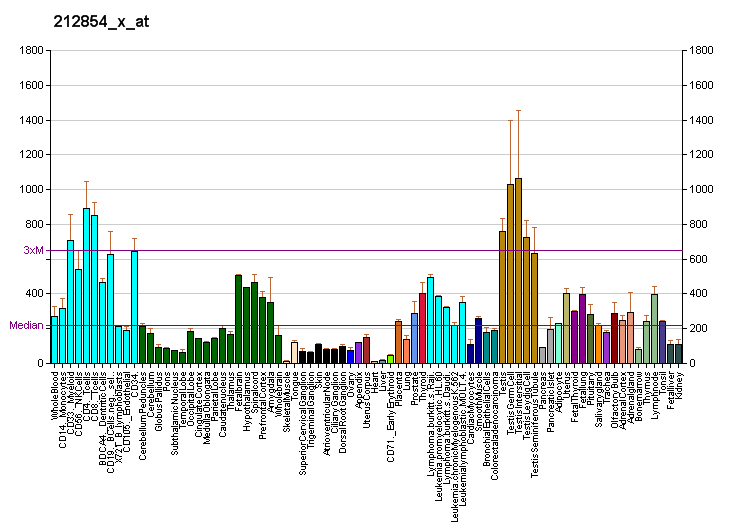

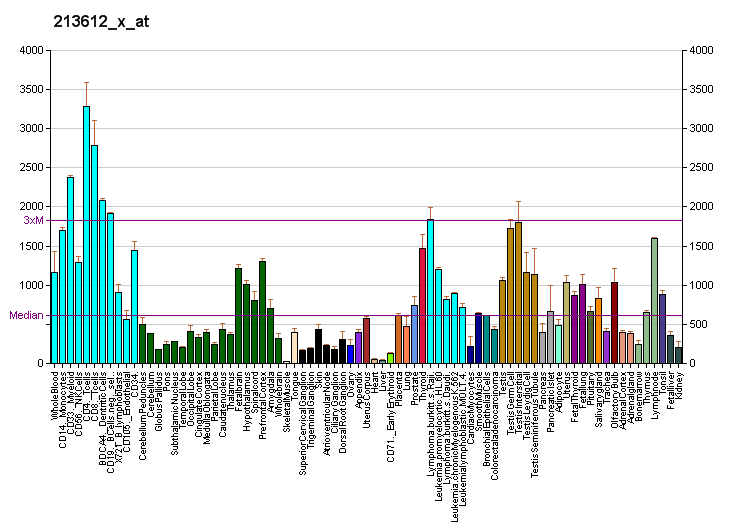
RNA expression pattern
Bgee	Human / Mouse (ortholog); Top expressed in: stromal cell of endometrium; epithelium of colon; testicle; right testis; right adrenal cortex; gonad; left testis; sural nerve; left adrenal cortex; ventricular zone / n/a; More reference expression data
BioGPS	More reference expression data
Orthologs
Databases	NCBI: entry; OMA: entry
Species	Human	Mouse
Entrez	84224	n/a
Ensembl	ENSG00000142794	n/a
UniProt	Q9H094	n/a
RefSeq (mRNA)	NM_001256416; NM_001256417; NM_032264; NM_001330381; NM_001377491 NM_001377492; NM_001377493; NM_001377494; NM_001377495; NM_001377496	n/a
RefSeq (protein)	NP_001243345; NP_001243346; NP_001317310; NP_115640; NP_001364420 NP_001364421; NP_001364422; NP_001364423; NP_001364424; NP_001364425	n/a
Location (UCSC)	Chr 1: 21.44 – 21.49 Mb	n/a
PubMed search		n/a
- Wikidata
View/Edit Human

Neuroblastoma breakpoint family, member 3, also known as NBPF3, is a human gene of the neuroblastoma breakpoint family, which resides on chromosome 1 of the human genome. NBPF3 is located at 1p36.12, immediately upstream of genes ALPL and RAP1GAP.

== Protein sequence ==
The NBPF3 gene is 633 amino acids long and contains five DUF1220 domains, which are highlighted in the image below. DUF1220 domains are found in all other members of the neuroblastoma breakpoint family. The protein has a very repetitive structure, since, along with the remaining members of its protein family, it likely arose form segmental duplications on chromosome 1.

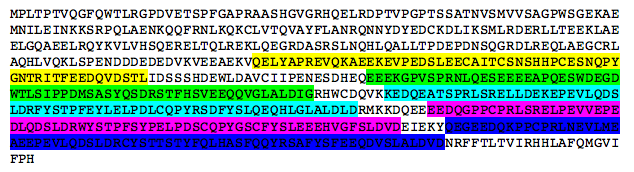

The domains are located at residues 236–298, 322–385, 394–460, 469–535, and 544–610.

The protein sequence is rich in three amino acids that are polar and negatively charged at physiological pH: glutamic acid, aspartic acid and glutamine. The isoelectric point of the protein is 4.21, the acidity of which may be attributed to the abundance of these amino acids.

== Isoforms and sequence characteristics ==
There are four known isoforms of the NPBF3 gene. While isoform 1 is the dominant form of the gene, each other isoform has unique changes to the protein sequence that may affect the structure, expression or function of the gene product:

Isoform	Sequence Omissions	Sequence Additions	Length
1	-	-	633
2	1-56	-	577
3	350-386	331 R→RSSGRFCCLISVGYIFCHPCPAWLIR	621
4	1-358	-	275

These isoforms are represented in the following schematic, along with additional sequence characteristics which include Poly-Glu compositional biases and a potential coiled coil.

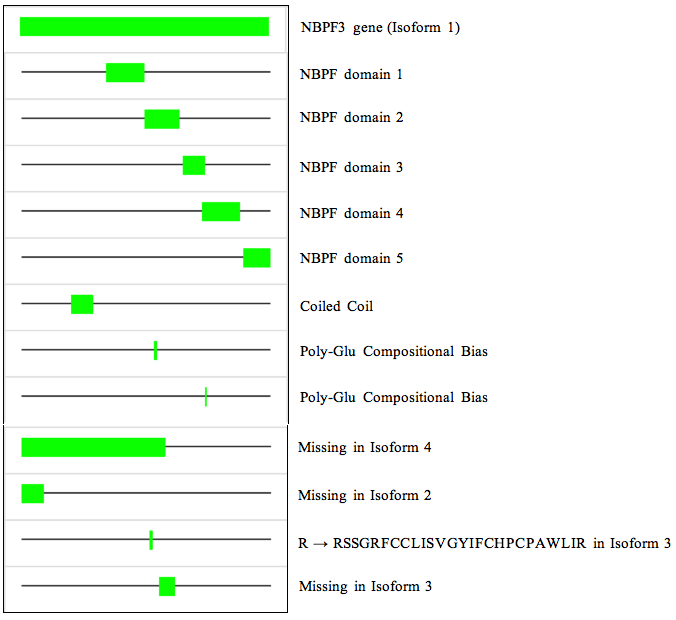

== Function ==
The function of the neuroblastoma breakpoint family proteins, including NPBF3, is not yet understood by the scientific community. Because of the repetitive composition of this family of genes as well as their amplification in primates, it has been suggested that the family is involved in cognitive development and the evolution of primates.

It has also been suggested that there is a connection between the neuroblastoma breakpoint family and oncogenesis. Due to the up-regulation of NBPF genes in some tumor tissues, proteins of this family have been hypothesized to be oncogenes. It has also been suggested that members of the neuroblastoma breakpoint family are tumor suppressor genes, due to a loss of heterozygosity in tumor tissue in the region of chromosome 1 where NBPF3 and other NBPF proteins are located.

== Homology ==
Orthologs of NBPF3 are found primarily in primate species, though orthologous sequences can be found in cow, horse, and dog species. There is no mouse ortholog of NPBF3.

Species	Organism common name	NCBI accession	Sequence identity	Sequence similarity	Length (AAs)	Number of DUF1220 domains
Homo sapiens	Human	CAB66824	100%	100%	633	5
Pan troglodytes	Chimpanzee	XP_001163311.1	96%	98%	633	5
Macaca mulatta	Rhesus macaque	XP_001114167.1	55%	65%	620	4
Pongo albelii	Orangutan	NP_001127345.1	89%	93%	202	3
Bos taurus	Cow	XP_611707.4	33%	49%	816	4
Equus caballus	Horse	XP_001916030.1	37%	55%	1037	0
Canis lupus familiaris	Dog	XP_540269.2	40%	59%	176	0

NPBF3 has many human paralogs because it is a member of a gene family.

Species	Gene name	NCBI accession	Sequence identity	Sequence similarity	Length (AAs)
Homo sapiens	NBPF3	CAB66824	100%	100%	633
Homo sapiens	NBPF10	NP_001034792.2	77%	83%	867
Homo sapiens	NBPF1	NP_060410.2	75%	83%	1214
Homo sapiens	NBPF20	NP_001032764.1	75%	84%	942
Homo sapiens	NBPF8	XP_001726998.1	75%	84%	3815
Homo sapiens	NBPF16	NP_001096133.1	75%	84%	670
Homo sapiens	NBPF15	NP_775909.1	75%	84%	670
Homo sapiens	NBPF11	NP_899228.3	75%	83%	790
Homo sapiens	NBPF14	NP_056198.1	74%	83%	921
Homo sapiens	NBPF9	XP_001717450.1	80%	88%	687
Homo sapiens	NBPF7	NP_001041445.1	69%	79%	421
Homo sapiens	NBPF6	NP_001137459.1	54%	68%	667
Homo sapiens	NBPF4	NP_001137461.1	53%	67%	638
Homo sapiens	NBPF12	XP_001715862.1	55%	63%	427
Homo sapiens	NBPF5	XP_001714524.1	60%	73%	428

Both orthologs and paralogs of NBPF3 were found using the databases BLAT. and BLAST

== Protein interactions ==
NPBF3 interacts with three other proteins: C1orf19, ankyrin-1 (ANK1) and Ewing sarcoma breakpoint region 1 (EWSR1). It is not known how these proteins interact or what the product of these interactions may be.
