= NBPF26 =

Human gene

Identifiers
- Aliases: NBPF26, NBPF member 26
- External IDs: GeneCards: NBPF26

Gene location (Human)
Chr.	Chromosome 1 (human)
Band	1p11.2	Start	120,723,949 bp
Band	1p11.2	End	120,842,110 bp
RNA expression pattern
Bgee	Human / Mouse (ortholog); Top expressed in: sural nerve; ventricular zone; Achilles tendon; right coronary artery; gastric mucosa; granulocyte; skin of leg; appendix; skin of abdomen; blood / n/a; More reference expression data
BioGPS	n/a
Orthologs
Databases	NCBI: entry; OMA: entry
Species	Human	Mouse
Entrez	101060684	n/a
Ensembl	ENSG00000273136	n/a
UniProt	B4DH59	n/a
RefSeq (mRNA)	NM_001351372; NM_001395637; NM_001405520	n/a
RefSeq (protein)	n/a	n/a
Location (UCSC)	Chr 1: 120.72 – 120.84 Mb	n/a
PubMed search		n/a
- Wikidata
View/Edit Human

NBPF26, or Neuroblastoma breakpoint family member 26, is a protein encoded by the NBPF26 gene in Homo sapiens. The alias for NBPF26 is notch 2 N-terminal like R (NOTCH2NLR). NBPF26 encodes 13 Olduvai domains, which are thought to contribute to the rapid expansion of the neocortex in humans.

== Gene ==
=== Locus ===
The NBPF26 gene is located on the plus strand of chromosome 1 (1p11.2) from 120,723,945 to 120,842,229, spanning 118,285 base pairs. NOTCH2NLR is an alias of NBPF26 and overlaps with beginning of NBPF26's coding sequence.

=== Genomic neighborhood ===
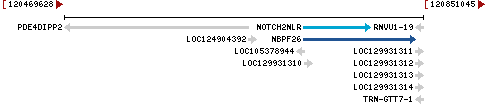
Human NBPF26 genomic neighborhood and location.

Within the genomic neighborhood of human NBPF26, phosphodiesterase 4D interacting protein-like pseudogene 2 (PDE4DIPP2), NOTCH2NLR, Rosellinia necatrix victorivirus 1-19 (RnVV1-19), and tRNA-Asn (anticodon GTT) 7-1 (TRN-GTT7-1) can be found.

== mRNA ==
NBPF26 encodes three isoform variants shown in the table below. Isoform one is the longest variant and spans 6,891 base pairs.

Human NBPF26 Isoforms
Isoform	Nucleotide Accession #	mRNA Length (bp)	Protein Accession #	Protein Length (aa)	Molecular Weight (kDa)
1	NM_001405520.1	6,891	NP_001392449.1	1,673	190
2	NM_001351372.2	6,666	NP_001338301.2	1,598	182
3	NM_001395637.2	6,216	NP_001382566.1	1448	165

== Protein ==
=== Composition ===
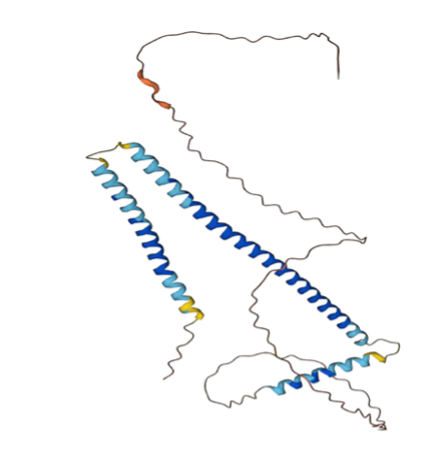
NBPF26 Tertiary Structure. Structure created with AlphaFold.

NBPF26 isoform one has a predicted molecular weight of 190 kDa and an isoelectric point of 4.6. Relative to other proteins, NBPF26 is rich in glutamic acid, glutamine, and cysteine, and poor in isoleucine. Two positive charge clusters, spanning 22 amino acids, are located at positions 1,241-1,262 and 1,560-1,581.

=== Motifs ===
Five EGF-like domains and one calcium-binding EGF-like domain are encoded in NBPF26.

NBPF26 also encodes 13 Olduvai domains. Positions and sequences of Conserved 1-3 (Con1-3) and Human lineage-specific 1-3 (HLS1-3) Olduvai clades are shown in the table below.

NBPF26 Olduvai Domains
Clade	Position (aa)	Sequence
Con1	442-505	EKVLESSAPREVQKTEESKVPEDSLEECAITCSNSHGPCDSNQPHKNIKITFEEDEVNSTLVVD
Con1	713-775	EKVQKSSAPREMQKAEEKEVPEDSLEECAITCSNSHGPYDCNQPHRKTKITFEEDKVDSTLIG
Con2	799-862	EEKGPVSPRNLQESEEEEVPQESWDEGYSTLSIPPEMLASYKSYSSTFHSLEEQQVCMAVDIG
HLS1	871-937	KEDHEATGPRLSRELLDEKGPEVLQDSLDRCYSTPSGCLELTDSCQPYRSAFYVLEQQRVGLAVDMD
HLS1	946-1,012	EEDQDPSCPRLSGELLDEKEPEVLQESLDRCYSTPSGCLELTDSCQPYRSAFYILEQQRVGLAVDMD
HLS1	1,021-1,087	EEDQDPSCPRLSGELLDEKEPEVLQESLDRCYSTPSGCLELTDSCQPYRSAFYILEQQRVGLAVDMD
HLS2	1,096-1,162	EEDQDPSCPRLSRELLDEKEPEVLQDSLGRCYSTPSGYLELPDLGQPYSSAVYSLEEQYLGLALDVD
HLS3	1,171-1,237	EEDQGPPCPRLSRELLEVVEPEVLQDSLDRCYSTPSSCLEQPDSCQPYGSSFYALEEKHVGFSLDV
HLS1	1,265-1331	EEDQNPPCPRLSRELLDEKGPEVLQDSLDRCYSTPSGCLELTDSCQPYRSAFYILEQQRVGLAVDMD
HLS3	1,340-1,406	EEDQDPSCPRLSRELLEVVEPEVLQDSLDRCYSTPSSCLEQPDSCQPYGSSFYALEEKHVGFSLDVG
HLS2	1,415-1,481	EEDQDPSCPRLSRELLDEKEPEVLQDSLGRCYSTPSGYLELPDLGQPYSSAVYSLEEQYLGLALDVD
HLS3	1,490-1,556	EEDQGPPCPRLSRELLEVVEPEVLQDSLDRCYSTPSSCLEQPDSCQPYGSSFYALEEKHVGFSLDVG
Con3	1,584-1,650	EEDQNPPCPRLNSMLMEVEEPEVLQDSLDICYSTPSMYFELPDSFQHYRSVFYSFEEEHISFALYVD

=== Post-translational modifications ===
NBPF26 is phosphorylated at amino acids 46, 48, 97, and 228. In addition, NBPF26 is predicted to undergo sulfonation, C-mannosylation, N-glycosylation, and O-glycosylation. Three furin cleavage sites are found at amino acid positions 379, 1252, and 1571.

=== Protein interactions ===
NBPF26 is predicted to interact with Estrogen receptor 1 (ESR1), APEX nuclease (multifunctional DNA repair enzyme) 1 (APEX1), lysine (K)-specific demethylase 1A (KDM1A), trans-golgi network protein 2 (TGOLN2), and tripartite motif containing 25 (TRIM25).

== Homology ==
=== Orthologs ===
Distant orthologs for human NBPF26 can be found in primates, birds, reptiles, amphibians, fish, and some invertebrates. Select orthologs are shown in the table below.

NBPF26 Orthologs
Class	Genus and species	Common name	Gene name	Accession #	Length (aa)	Identity (%)	Similarity (%)
Mammalia	Pan troglodytes	Chimpanzee	NBPF14	XP_054958524	1,615	53.9	57.8
Mammalia	Gorilla gorilla gorilla	Gorilla	NBPF12	XP_055212742.1	2,428	54.3	56.0
Mammalia	Mus musculus	House Mouse	NOTCH2	NP_035058.2	2,473	16.0	21.2
Mammalia	Enhydra lutris kenyoni	Northern Sea Otter	NBPF26	XP_022351917.1	2,358	12.3	21.6
Aves	Dryobates pubescens	Downy woodpecker	NOTCH2	XP_054021673.1	2,453	20.1	29.7
Aves	Antrostomus carolinensis	Chuck-will's-widow	NOTCH2	XP_010174161	2,401	19.1	28.5
Aves	Strigops habroptila	Owl Parrot	NOTCH2	XP_030350503.1	2,432	15.6	22.4
Aves	Anser cygnoides	Swan goose	NBPF26	XP_047936201.1	2,359	13.7	24.1
Reptilia	Trachemys scripta elegans	Red-eared slider	NOTCH2	XP_034634874.1	2,397	20.0	29.8
Reptilia	Alligator mississippiensis	American alligator	NOTCH2	XP_006260017.1	2,435	16.7	24.2
Reptilia	Podarcis raffonei	Aeolian wall lizard	NOTCH1	XP_053230981.1	2,531	14.6	22.8
Reptilia	Pseudonaja textilis	Eastern brown snake	NOTCH3	XP_026552021.1	2,416	14.3	21.3
Amphibia	Spea bombifrons	Plains spadefoot toad	NOTCH2L	XP_053317909.1	2,419	17.0	25.7
Amphibia	Xenopus laevis	African clawed frog	NOTCH2	XP_018114267.1	2,450	15.0	22.6
Amphibia	Geotrypetes seraphini	Gaboon caecilian	NOTCH3	XP_033779639.1	2,472	14.6	21.8
Amphibia	Hyla sarda	Sardinian tree frog	MTF1	XP_056404323.1	1,169	12.4	22.3
Chordata	Acipenser ruthenus	Sterlet	NOTCH2	XP_058887354.1	2,454	16.4	24.7
Chordata	Callorhinchus milii	Australian ghostshark	NOTCH2	XP_042190840.1	2,819	16.0	23.8
Chordata	Petromyzon marinus	Sea lamprey	NOTCH1L	XP_032815028.1	2,536	14.9	23.2
Chordata	Paramormyrops kingsleyae	Elephantfish	NOTCH2L	XP_023699719.1	2,420	14.4	22.2
Invertebrates	Amphimedon queenslandica	Sponge	FBPP1L	XP_019855855	698	8.1	14.4

=== Paralogs ===
Human NBPF26 has multiple paralogs. The top 10 are shown in the table below.

Human NBPF26 Paralogs
Name	Accession #	Length (aa)	Identity (%)	Similarity (%)
NBPF1	NP_001392595.1	1,704	68.8	71.6
NBPF7	NP_001392671.1	1,704	68.2	71.0
LOC102724250	NP_001392459.1	1,704	67.7	70.4
NBPF1L	NP_001393481.1	1,949	66.1	68.7
NBPF12	KAI4082365.1	1,459	65.1	67.3
NBPF9	NP_001264373.1	1,111	64.7	65.2
NBPF20	XP_047301971.1	1,065	61.7	62.5
KIAA1693	BAB21784.1	901	50.7	51.8
NBPF8	XP_047285792.1	1,353	48.6	50.0
NBPF11	NP_001095133.3	865	46.3	47.9

== Expression ==
NBPF26 RNA expression is ubiquitous throughout human tissue.

== Clinical Significance ==
In lung cancer, mutations in NBPF26 were associated with local disease recurrence. NBPF26 expression in monocytes was increased in pregnant patients with rheumatoid arthritis compared to pregnancies without rheumatoid arthritis.

== Conceptual translation ==
A conceptual translation of human NBPF26 is shown below.

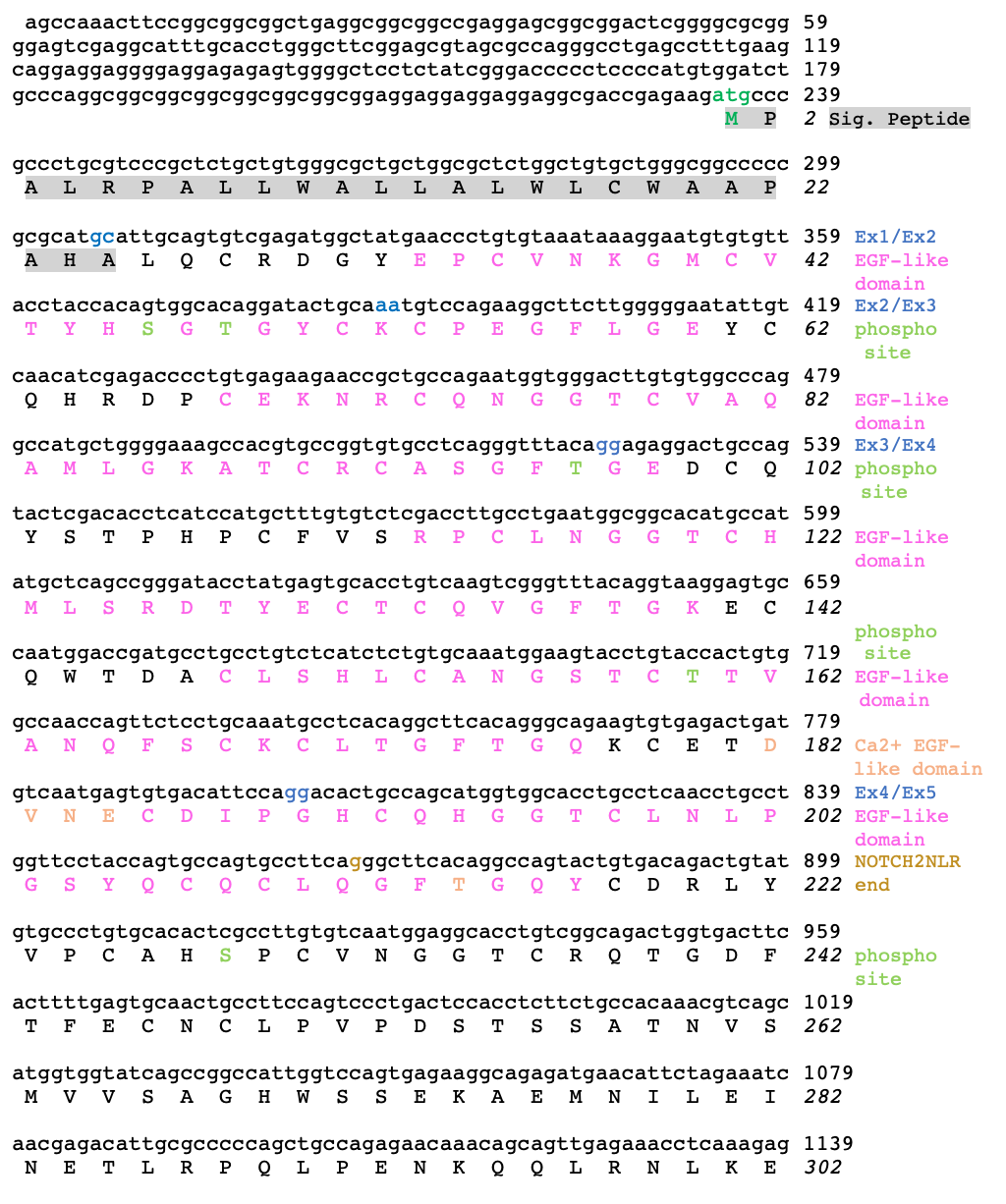

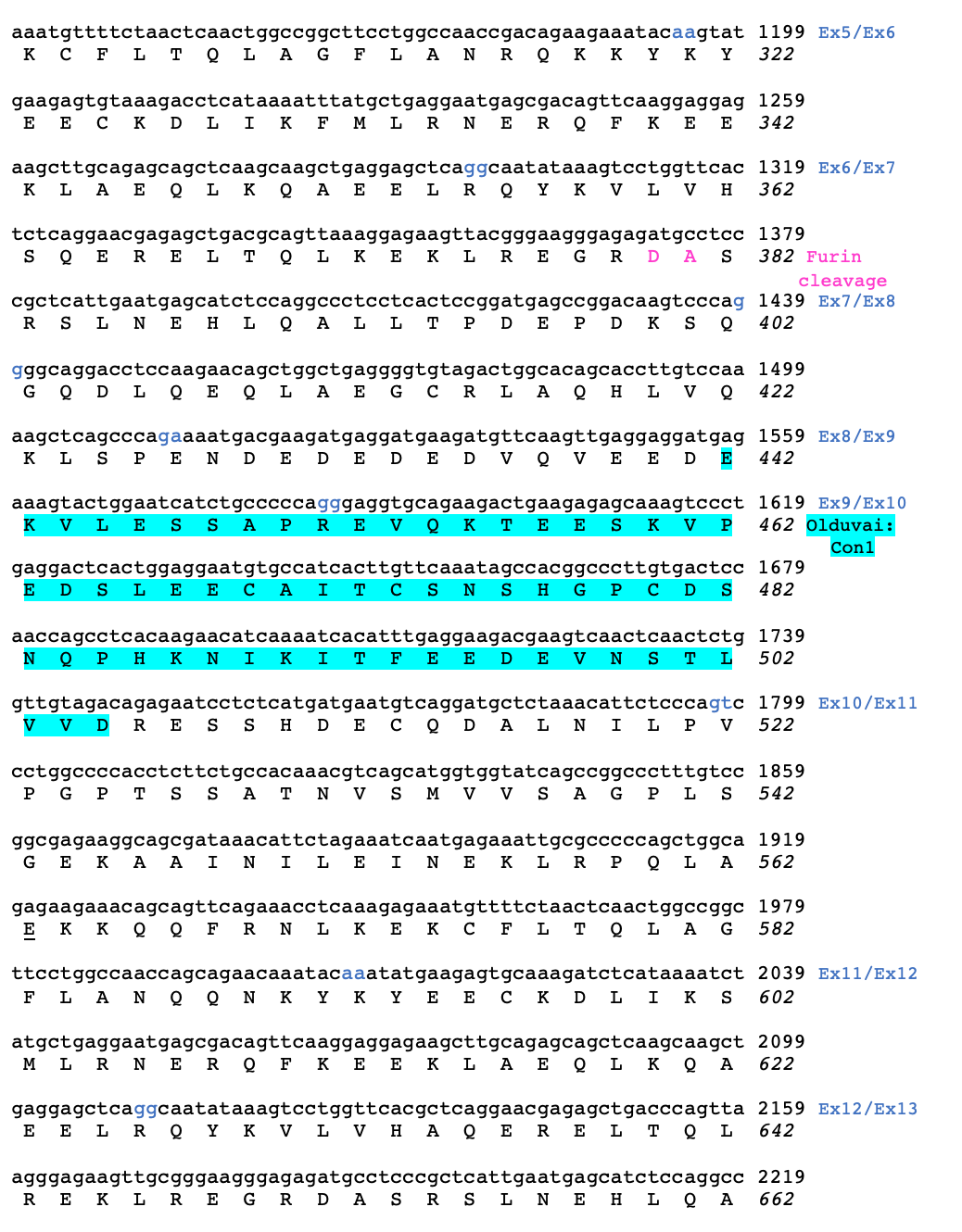

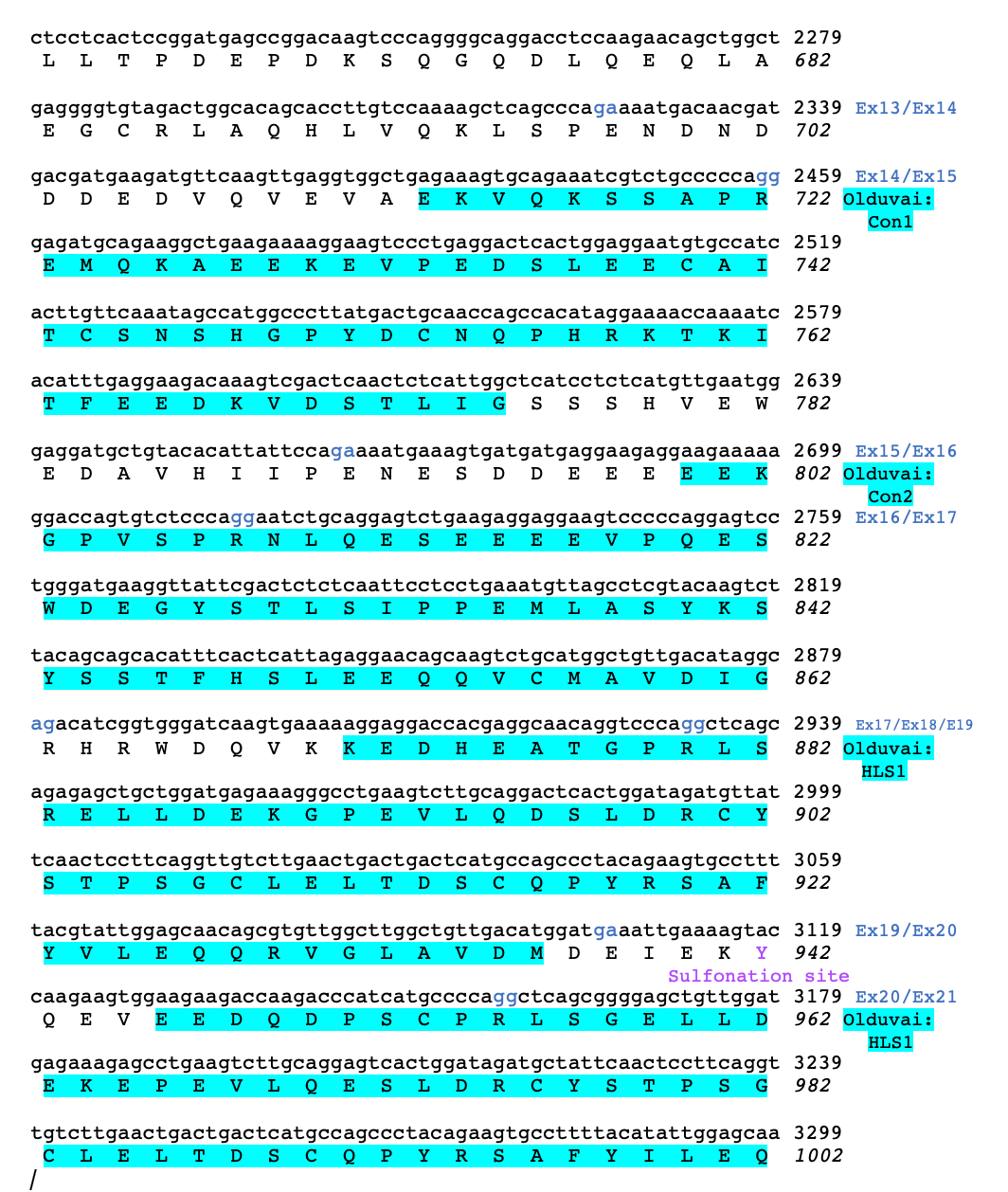

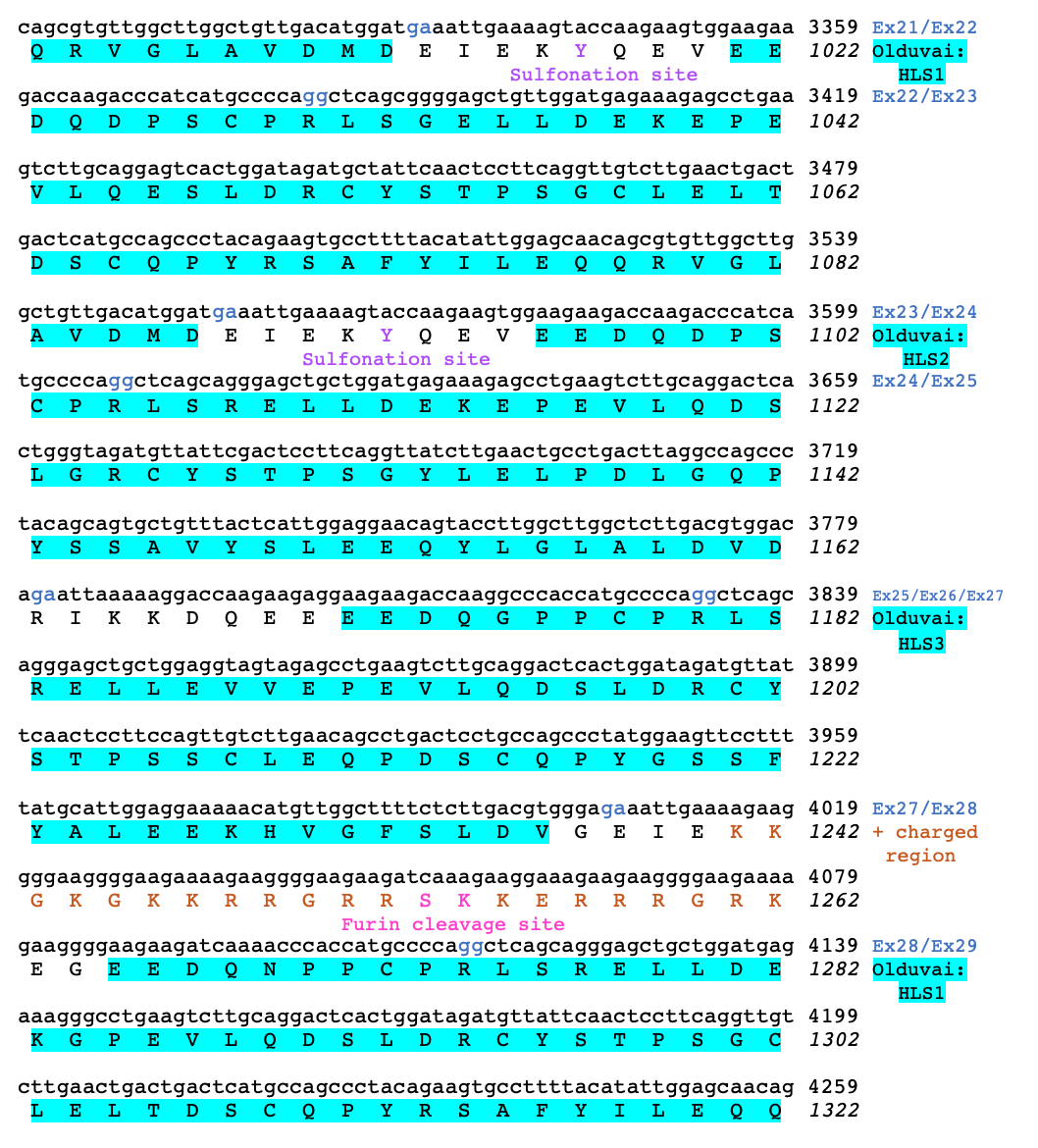

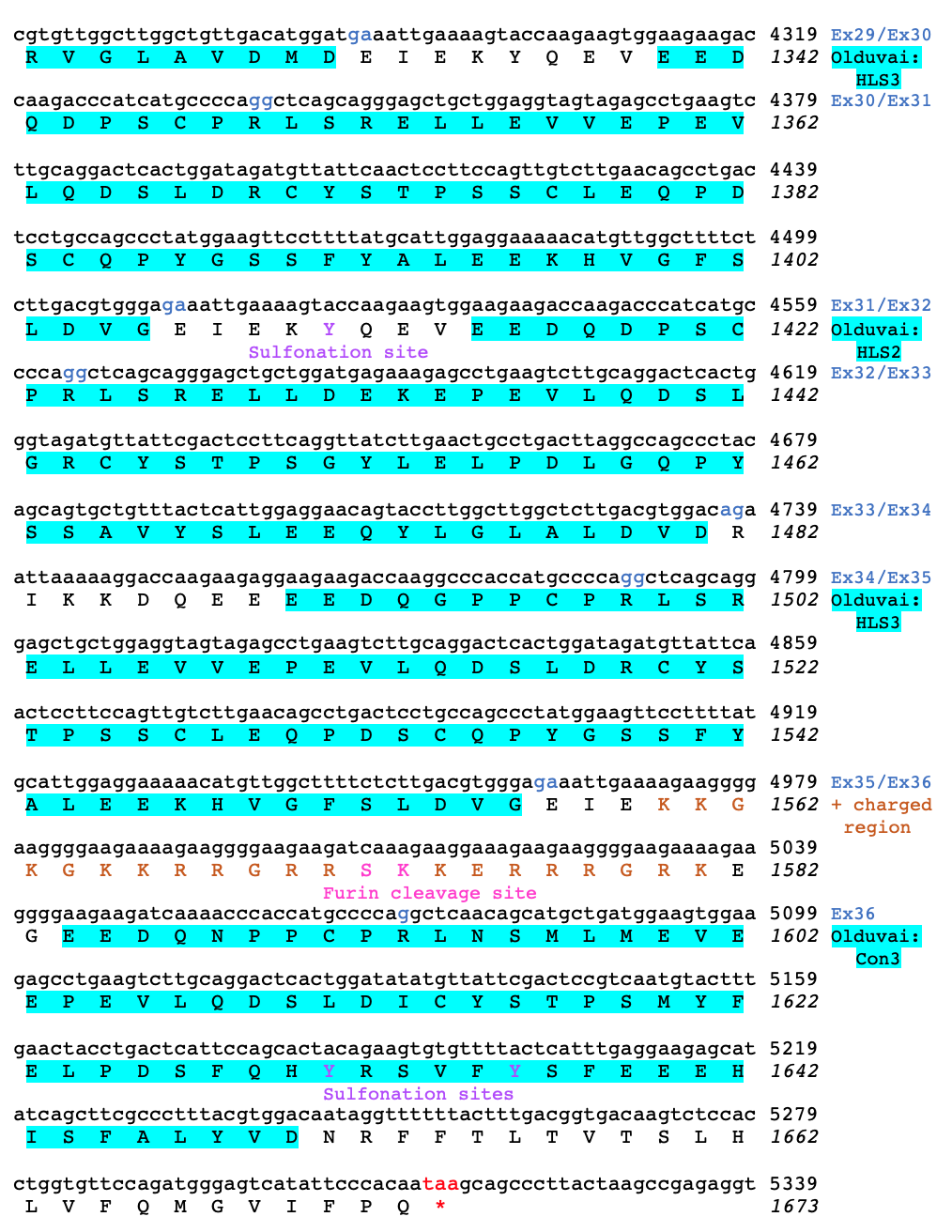

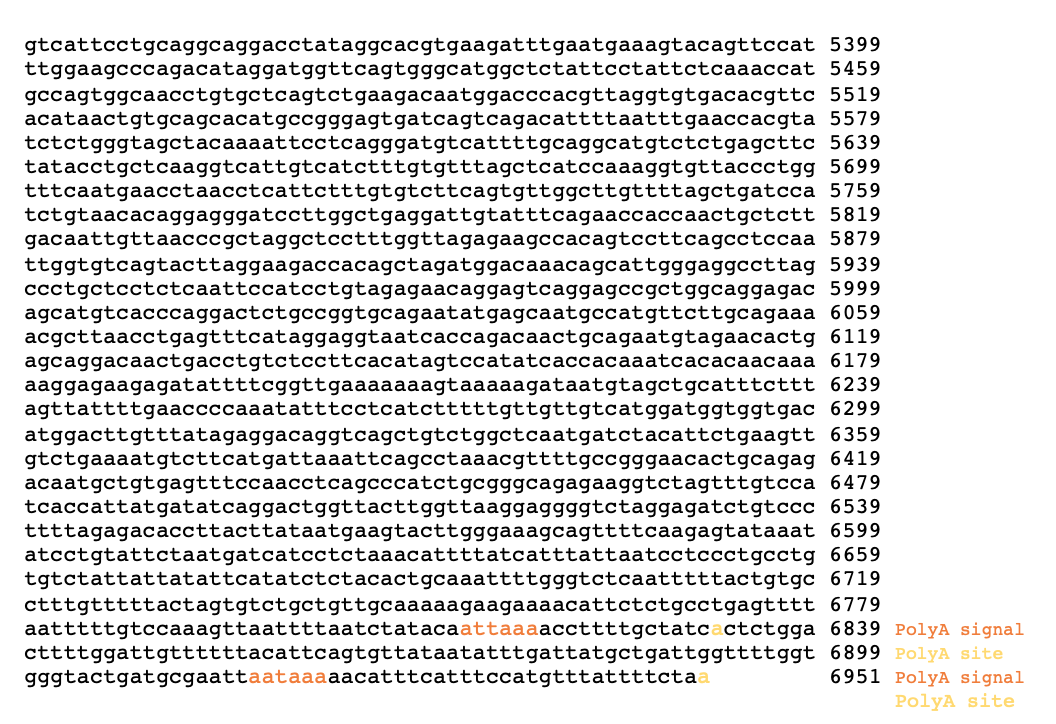
