= CDK5RAP2 =

Protein with roles in formation and stability of microtubules

Identifiers
- Aliases: CDK5RAP2, C48, Cep215, MCPH3, CDK5 regulatory subunit associated protein 2
- External IDs: OMIM: 608201; MGI: 2384875; GeneCards: CDK5RAP2

Gene location (Human)
Chr.	Chromosome 9 (human)
Band	9q33.2	Start	120,388,875 bp
Band	9q33.2	End	120,580,170 bp

Gene location (Mouse)
Chr.	Chromosome 4 (mouse)
Band	4|4 C2	Start	70,135,093 bp
Band	4|4 C2	End	70,328,680 bp
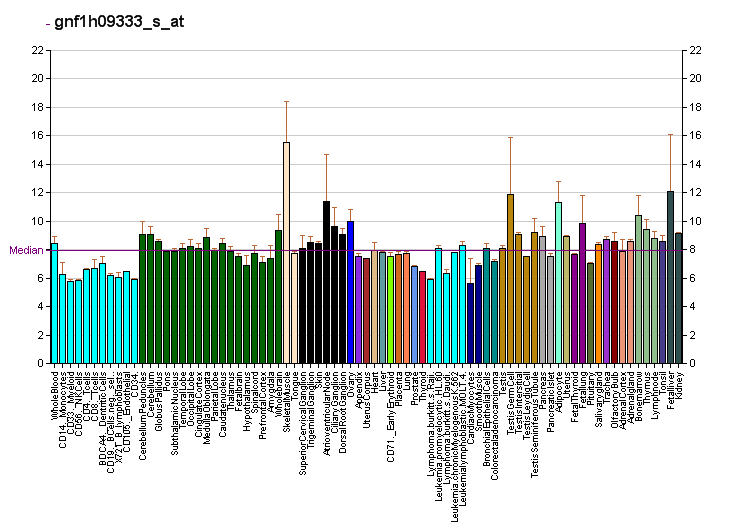

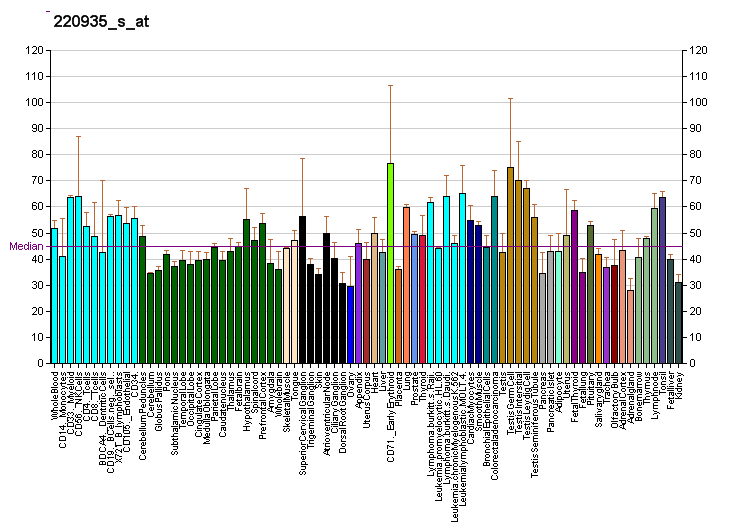
RNA expression pattern
Bgee	Human / Mouse (ortholog); Top expressed in: sural nerve; ventricular zone; right coronary artery; ganglionic eminence; muscle of thigh; gastrocnemius muscle; tendon of biceps brachii; minor salivary glands; ascending aorta; epithelium of colon / Top expressed in: tail of embryo; seminiferous tubule; spermatid; vestibular membrane of cochlear duct; genital tubercle; zygote; spermatocyte; ventricular zone; secondary oocyte; vestibular sensory epithelium; More reference expression data
BioGPS	More reference expression data
Gene ontology
Molecular function	microtubule binding; tubulin binding; protein binding; protein kinase binding; calmodulin binding; gamma-tubulin binding
Cellular component	cytoplasm; cytosol; mitotic spindle pole; centrosome; Golgi apparatus; spindle pole; pericentriolar material; microtubule organizing center; microtubule plus-end; cell junction; perinuclear region of cytoplasm; cytoskeleton; microtubule; extracellular exosome
Biological process	regulation of neuron differentiation; negative regulation of centriole replication; neurogenesis; negative regulation of neuron differentiation; chromosome segregation; positive regulation of transcription, DNA-templated; brain development; G2/M transition of mitotic cell cycle; microtubule bundle formation; regulation of spindle checkpoint; establishment of mitotic spindle orientation; centriole replication; microtubule organizing center organization; microtubule cytoskeleton organization; ciliary basal body-plasma membrane docking; centrosome cycle; regulation of G2/M transition of mitotic cell cycle; positive regulation of microtubule polymerization; regulation of mitotic cell cycle spindle assembly checkpoint
Sources:Amigo / QuickGO
Orthologs
Databases	NCBI: entry; OMA: entry
Species	Human	Mouse
Entrez	55755	214444
Ensembl	ENSG00000136861	ENSMUSG00000039298
UniProt	Q96SN8	P68254; Q8K389
RefSeq (mRNA)	NM_001011649; NM_001272039; NM_018249	NM_145990; NM_001313762
RefSeq (protein)	NP_001011649; NP_001258968; NP_060719	NP_035869; NP_001300691; NP_666102
Location (UCSC)	Chr 9: 120.39 – 120.58 Mb	Chr 4: 70.14 – 70.33 Mb
PubMed search
- Wikidata
View/Edit Human	View/Edit Mouse

CDK5 regulatory subunit-associated protein 2 is a protein that in humans is encoded by the CDK5RAP2 gene. It has necessary roles in the formation and stability of microtubules from the centrosome and has been found to be linked to human brain size variation in males. Multiple transcript variants exist for this gene, but the full-length nature of only two has been determined.

CDK5RAP2 is homologous to the Drosophila protein centrosomin (cnn) and paralogous to myomegalin, which in mammals contains an Olduvai domain, a domain implicated in human brain size evolution.

== Function ==
CDK5RAP2 is necessary for the proper formation, anchoring and orientation of microtubules from the centrosome. It binds with the γ-tubulin ring complex (γTuRC), and this is required for the γTuRC to attach to the centrosome. CDK5RAP2 also binds to p25, a form of CDK5R1 that serves as the activating subunit of CDK5, which is involved in the regulation of neuronal differentiation. CDK5RAP2 therefore has a role in neuronal differentiation. CDK5RAP2 is also necessary as a scaffolding protein in the centrosomal corona of Dictyostelium.

== Clinical significance ==
=== Human brain size variation ===
An MRI study has demonstrated a link between common human variation in the CDK5RAP2 gene and brain structure. More specifically, associations were found between several single nucleotide polymorphisms (SNPs) and brain cortical surface area and total brain volume. These associations were found exclusively in male subjects, and all SNPs were located either in the last 7 introns or downstream of the gene. The functional significance of these loci is not yet known. However, given their location close to regulatory elements, it is possible that they are involved in gene regulation, which suggests that common variance in brain structure could be associated with differences in gene regulation rather than protein structure, consistent with findings in other complex human traits. CDK5RAP2 is a paralogue of myomegalin, which in mammals contains an Olduvai domain, a domain with human-specific duplications that have been implicated in human brain size evolution.

=== Autosomal recessive primary microcephaly ===
Mutations in CDK5RAP2 cause autosomal recessive primary microcephaly type 3.

== Interactions ==
CDK5RAP2 has been shown to interact with CDK5R1 and pericentrin (PCTN).

== History ==
The gene was discovered in 2000 and was first characterised in 2007.
