= Myomegalin =

Vertebrate protein involved in the formation of microtubules

PDE4DIP

Identifiers
- Aliases: PDE4DIP, CMYA2, MMGL, phosphodiesterase 4D interacting protein
- External IDs: OMIM: 608117; MGI: 1891434; GeneCards: PDE4DIP

Gene location (Human)
Chr.	Chromosome 1 (human)
Band	1q21.2	Start	148,808,181 bp
Band	1q21.2	End	149,048,286 bp

Gene location (Mouse)
Chr.	Chromosome 3 (mouse)
Band	3 F2.2|3 42.28 cM	Start	97,597,140 bp
Band	3 F2.2|3 42.28 cM	End	97,796,023 bp
RNA expression pattern
Bgee	Human / Mouse (ortholog); Top expressed in: apex of heart; muscle of thigh; gastrocnemius muscle; right auricle of heart; right hemisphere of cerebellum; Achilles tendon; gastric mucosa; right frontal lobe; popliteal artery; tibial arteries / Top expressed in: muscle of thigh; spermatocyte; lip; spermatid; triceps brachii muscle; superior frontal gyrus; retinal pigment epithelium; pituitary gland; temporal muscle; neural layer of retina; More reference expression data
BioGPS	n/a
Gene ontology
Molecular function	enzyme binding; protein binding; molecular adaptor activity
Cellular component	myofibril; cytoplasm; microtubule organizing center; cytoskeleton; centrosome; Golgi apparatus; nucleus; cortical microtubule plus-end
Biological process	regulation of Golgi organization; astral microtubule organization; positive regulation of microtubule nucleation
Sources:Amigo / QuickGO
Orthologs
Databases	NCBI: entry; OMA: entry
Species	Human	Mouse
Entrez	9659	83679
Ensembl	ENSG00000178104	ENSMUSG00000038170
UniProt	Q5VU43	Q80YT7
RefSeq (mRNA)	NM_001002810; NM_001002811; NM_001002812; NM_001195260; NM_001195261 NM_001198832; NM_001198834; NM_014644; NM_022359; NM_001350520; NM_001350521; NM_001350522; NM_001350523; NM_001377392; NM_001377393	NM_001039376; NM_001110163; NM_001289701; NM_001289702; NM_031401 NM_177145; NM_178080
RefSeq (protein)	NP_001002810; NP_001002811; NP_001002812; NP_001182189; NP_001182190 NP_001185761; NP_001185763; NP_001337449; NP_001337450; NP_001337451; NP_001337452; NP_055459; NP_071754; NP_001364321; NP_001364322	NP_001034465; NP_001276630; NP_001276631; NP_835181
Location (UCSC)	Chr 1: 148.81 – 149.05 Mb	Chr 3: 97.6 – 97.8 Mb
PubMed search
- Wikidata
View/Edit Human	View/Edit Mouse

Myomegalin, also known as phosphodiesterase 4D-interacting protein or cardiomyopathy-associated protein 2, is a protein that in humans is encoded by the PDE4DIP gene. It has roles in the formation of microtubules from the centrosome. Its name derives from the fact that it is highly expressed in units of tubular myofibrils known as sarcomeres and is a large protein, at 2,324 amino acids. It was first characterised in 2000.

== Structure and function ==
Myomegalin is mostly composed of alpha-helix and coiled-coil structures and has domains shared with microtubule-associated proteins. It has several isoforms, at least two of which have been characterised, CM-MMG and EB-MMG.

Myomegalin is necessary for the sufficient growth of microtubules from the centrosomes. The CM-MMG isoform binds at the centrosome with γ-tubulin in an AKAP9-dependent manner and on the near side of the Golgi apparatus, while the EB-MMG isoform binds with MAPRE1 at the Golgi apparatus and increases MAPRE1's effects on microtubule growth.

Myomegalin, specifically the CM-MMG isoform, is a paralogue of CDK5RAP2. Myomegalin depletion in cells does not lead to decreases in γ-tubulin or CDK5RAP2, unlike CDK5RAP2 depletion, and does not appear to affect mitosis through various spindle anchoring and orientation defects, unlike CDK5RAP2. This indicates that CDK5RAP2 can somewhat serve to compensate for the absence of myomegalin. However, myomegalin-depleted cells have slower migration, since microtubules are crucial for cell motility.

Orthologues of myomegalin are seen in vertebrates as far back as bony fish, around 450 million years ago. In mammals, around 200 million years ago, myomegalin gained an Olduvai domain. Olduvai domains have so far only elsewhere been found in NBPF genes in placental mammals, many of which are adjacent to myomegalin on chromosome 1, so it is believed that these genes originated from a duplication of myomegalin. Increased NPBF Olduvai domain duplications in humans have been implicated in human brain size evolution.

== Interactions ==
Myomegalin (PDE4DIP) has been shown to interact with PDE4D.

== History ==
The protein was discovered in 2000 and was so named because it was highly expressed in rat heart muscle sarcomeres (units of tubular myofibrils) and is a large protein, at 2,324 amino acids.

== See also ==
- 1q21.1 deletion syndrome
- 1q21.1 duplication syndrome
