= NBPF10 =

Protein-coding gene in humans

Identifiers
- Aliases: NBPF10, AB6, AG1, neuroblastoma breakpoint family member 10, NBPF member 10
- External IDs: OMIM: 614000; GeneCards: NBPF10

Gene location (Human)
Chr.	Chromosome 1 (human)
Band	1q21.1	Start	146,064,711 bp
Band	1q21.1	End	146,229,000 bp
RNA expression pattern
Bgee	Human / Mouse (ortholog); Top expressed in: nipple; buccal mucosa cell; visceral pleura; skin of thigh; trabecular bone; skin of hip; caput epididymis; tibia; trigeminal ganglion; vulva / n/a; More reference expression data
BioGPS	n/a
Orthologs
Databases	NCBI: entry; OMA: entry
Species	Human	Mouse
Entrez	100132406	n/a
Ensembl	ENSG00000271425	n/a
UniProt	Q6P3W6	n/a
RefSeq (mRNA)	NM_001302371; NM_001039703	n/a
RefSeq (protein)	n/a	n/a
Location (UCSC)	Chr 1: 146.06 – 146.23 Mb	n/a
PubMed search		n/a
- Wikidata
View/Edit Human

Neuroblastoma breakpoint family member 10 is a protein that in Homo sapiens is encoded by the NBPF10 gene.

The full gene is 75,313 bp, with the major isoform of mRNA being 10,697 bp long. The gene is located at 1q21.1. NBPF contains what is known as the DUF1220 repeats. The highly conserved, repeated region is believed to be originated from MGC8902. The NBPF family has been linked to primate evolution. It is assumed to be related to the 1q21.1 deletion syndrome and 1q21.1 duplication syndrome.

== Homology ==
Paralogs of NBPF10 includes other NBPF family members. Orthologs of NBPF10 are found in other primates; distant orthologs are found in bovine, equine, and canine

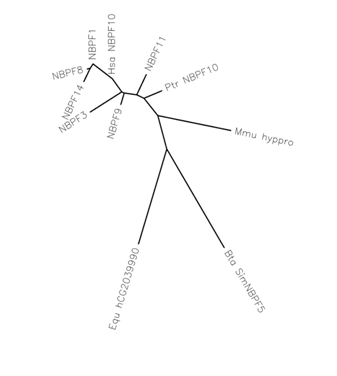

== Functional role ==
Although NBPF10's function is unknown, there is reason to believe that NBPF10 is an important biomarker for the Odontoblast Phenotype

== Gene neighborhood ==
NOTCH2NL, SEC22B, HFE2, TXNIP are close neighbors of NBPF10. All of these neighboring genes are well studied in their own right.

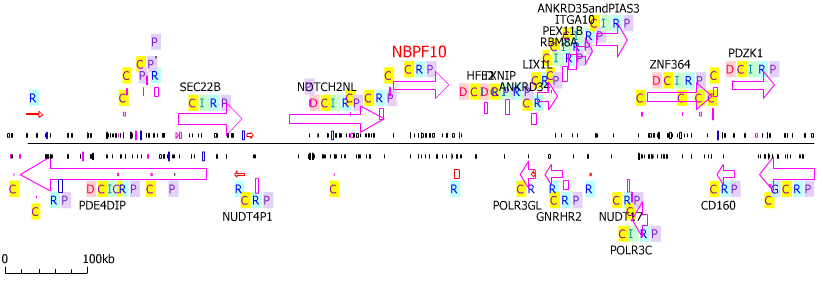

== Post-translational modification ==
NBPF10 has extremely low threonine content which may make the protein less susceptible to post-translational modification.
