= NBPF1 =

Protein found in humans

Identifiers
- Aliases: NBPF1, AB13, AB14, AB23, AD2, NBG, NBPF, neuroblastoma breakpoint family member 1, NBPF member 1
- External IDs: OMIM: 610501; GeneCards: NBPF1

Gene location (Human)
Chr.	Chromosome 1 (human)
Band	1p36.13	Start	16,562,319 bp
Band	1p36.13	End	16,613,562 bp
RNA expression pattern
Bgee	Human / Mouse (ortholog); Top expressed in: secondary oocyte; right adrenal gland; ventricular zone; right adrenal cortex; left adrenal cortex; ganglionic eminence; C1 segment; epithelium of colon; rectum; smooth muscle tissue / n/a; More reference expression data
BioGPS	n/a
Orthologs
Databases	NCBI: entry; OMA: entry
Species	Human	Mouse
Entrez	55672	n/a
Ensembl	ENSG00000219481	n/a
UniProt	Q3BBV0	n/a
RefSeq (mRNA)	NM_017940	n/a
RefSeq (protein)	NP_060410	n/a
Location (UCSC)	Chr 1: 16.56 – 16.61 Mb	n/a
PubMed search		n/a
- Wikidata
View/Edit Human

Neuroblastoma breakpoint family, member 1, or NBPF1, is a protein that is encoded by the gene NBPF1 in humans. This protein is member of the neuroblastoma breakpoint family of proteins, a group of proteins that are thought to be involved in the development of the nervous system.

== Gene ==
The NBPF1 gene in humans is located on the minus strand of 1p36.3 in humans and is 51179 base pairs long including exons and introns. It is located between the protein coding genes NECAP2 and CROCC. NBPF1 is one of the 26 known members of the Neuroblastoma Breakpoint Family genes and pseudogenes. The NBPF2 pseudogene and NBPF3 gene are the most similar genes located close to NBPF1 and they reside on the chromosomal location 1p36.12. Most members of the NBPF gene family are located on chromosomal location 1q21.1-1q23.3 in humans, and these genes are more similar to each other in sequence than they are to NBPF1.

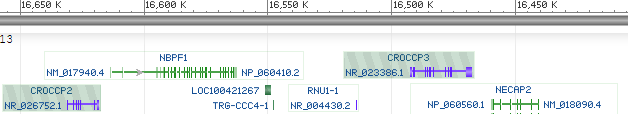
Location of NBPF1 in relation to other genes on chromosome 1

=== Transcript ===
The transcript for NBPF1 in humans is a 6183 base pair mRNA that is made of 28 exons. There are more than 14 alternative splicing forms of NBPF1 predicted, but only seven of the splice forms have been observed. Out of all of the possible transcripts, only two are known to code proteins. One of these transcripts is 1139 amino acids long with 23 coding exons, while and the other is 1095 amino acids long and 23 coding exons. The noncoding transcripts are processed, but their function is unknown.

== Protein ==
NBPF1 is a 1214 amino acid long protein in humans that weighs 139 kD and has an isoelectric point of around 5. A feature about this protein's composition is that it is much richer than most other proteins in both glutamine and glutamic acid residues. Additionally, it contains amino acid repeats that are present in humans, other primates, and even armadillos. Another feature is that the NBPF1 protein contains residues that are predicted to have post-translational modifications, including glycation, N-linked glycosylation, O-GlcNAc attachment, O-linked glycosylation, Phosphorylation, and Sumoylation. The two most important domain types in the NBPF1 protein are the coiled coil domains and DUF1220 domains. NBPF1 contains three coiled coil domains and nine DUF1220 domains in humans. The coiled coil domains are 60–100 amino acids long, while the DUF1220 domains are approximately 65 base pairs long with high sequence similarity.

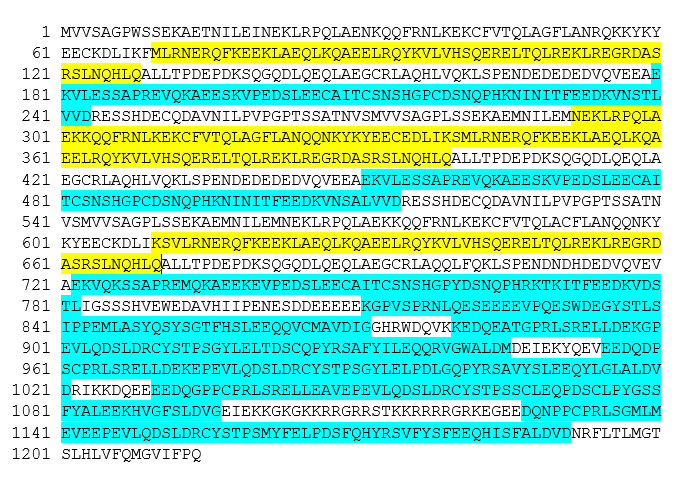
Amino acid sequence of NBPF1 that shows the locations DUF1220 domains(blue) and coiled coil domains(yellow)

== Interactions ==
Human NBPF1 has been shown to interact with Ubiquitin C via both protein complex immunoprecipitation and affinity chromatography. Two-hybrid screening assays have shown that NBPF1 interacts with the coiled coil domains of CBY1, a repressor for the Beta-catenin, a protein that is involved in Wnt signaling for cell proliferation. Additionally, two hybrid screen have shown that NBPF1 interacted with bacterial proteins, such as an oxidoreductase iron/ascorbate family protein from the bacterium Francisella tularensis and an uncharacterized protein from the bacterium Bacillus anthracis.

=== Functional and clinical significance ===
Although the function of the NBPF1 protein in unknown, its physical and chemical properties can give insight about its function. Like other NBPF proteins, the NBPF1 protein product contains a repeated domain called DUF1220, a domain of unknown function that is thought to be related to human brain complexity. First, NBPF1 is predicted to be a nuclear protein, as it contains positively charged nuclear localization signals. These nuclear localization signals in NBPF1 and a conserved DNA binding domain similar to the transcription factor STAT3/dna complex or STAT1/dna complex suggests that it could act as a transcription factor

This is the predicted nuclear localization signal of NBPF1 using the program PSORT II.

Second, genes like NBPF1 with DUF1220 genes are expressed during human neurogenesis. The number of DUF1220 domains present in the human genome correlates with both brain size and the amount of neurons present in the brain. Additionally, higher copy numbers of the DUF1220 domain are associated with increasing Autism severity, which often results from an excess of neurons that do not under synaptic pruning.

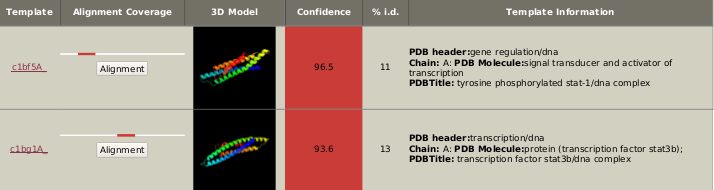
Predicted Structure of Stat-1 and Stat3b-like DNA binding domains in NBPF1 using Phyre2

The NBPF1 protein is also found to be disrupted by a chromosomal translocation between chromosomes 1 and 17 with in some cases of human neuroblastoma. Additional studies show that NBPF1 is possibly a tumor suppressor gene because adding it to cell cultures lowers the incidence of foci formation. Additionally, NBPF1 contains three coiled coil structures are commonly involved in oligomerization with other proteins. Based on the interactions listed above, NBPF1 is shown to interact with the coiled coil domain of CBY1, which represses Wnt signaling. Aberrant Wnt signaling in the brain is a common cause of tumor growth and drug resistance in neuroblastomas, further suggesting that NBPF1 could act as a tumor suppressor gene in the brain if it directly affects this pathway.

NBPF1 seems to be involved in proliferation during human neurogenesis, and growth suppression during adulthood. Showing that the DUF1220 and coiled coil domains may be important during different life stages. The DUF1220 domains are important in neurogenesis, while the coiled coil domains involved with the binding of cell proliferation inhibitors. Although there are no known differences between Autism and neuroblastoma rates are known, a study has shown the existence of comorbid microcephaly and neuroblastoma conditions, although more research is needed to show this. Based on these predictions, the lack of NBPF1 during could prevent fetal neurogenesis and postnatal tumor suppression in the brain, although this connection is not well understood.

== Expression ==
NBPF1 is ubiquitously expressed in all tissues in humans, but shows the highest levels of expression in the bone marrow, skeletal muscle, brain, and spinal cord. It is expressed at slightly lower levels in other tissues such as the pancreas, kidney, and lung. In the brain, NBPF1 expression is the highest in the frontal, temporal, and parietal lobes, and it lowest in the ventricles and cerebellum. Based on protein composition, NBPF1 in humans and its orthologs in related species is most likely to be localized in the nucleus.

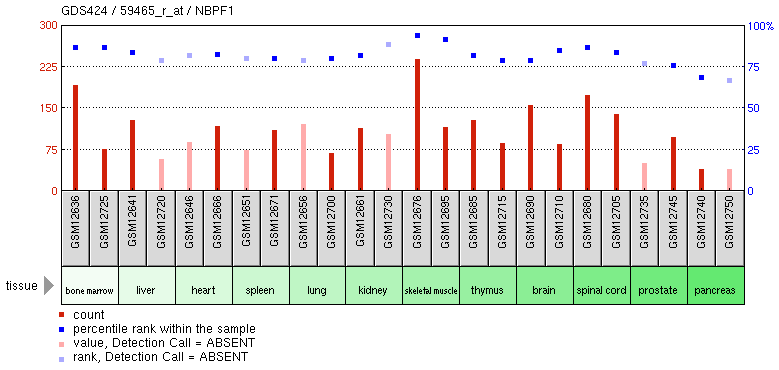
Expression for NBPF1 based on NCBI GEO Profiles, whole tissue expression profile

Predicted Localization of NBPF1 and its Orthologs

Species	%Nuclear	%Vacuolar	%Cytoplasmic	%Cytoskeletal
Human	87.0	4.3	4.3	4.3
Macaque	65.2	4.3	17.4	4.3
Baboon	82.6	0.0	13.0	0.0
Cow	65.2	0.0	17.4	0.0
Armadillo	65.2	0.0	13.0	0.0

Expression studies have shown changes in NBPF1 under different experimental conditions in vitro. First, the depletion of nervous system transcription factor SOX11 causes a slight increase in NBPF1 expression. Additionally, the inactivation of Far upstream element-binding protein 1 causes a decrease in NBPF1, while the inactivation of Far Upstream Binding Elements 2 and 3 causes an increase in NBPF1 expression. Far upstream binding elements are involved in transcriptional regulation using gene enhancers, each having different binding sites. The overexpression of CLDN1, a protein that forms tight junctions such as those of the blood–brain barrier, causes a sharp decline in NBPF1 expression

== Homology and evolution ==
=== Orthologs ===
Although NBPF1 itself only exists in primates, a wide variety of NBPF like protein orthologs exist in other mammals such as cattle, felines, and cetaceans. In non-primate mammals, the gene sequences of NBPF-like genes have little similarity to the primate NBPF genes. These genes appear to be entirely absent in model mammals such as mice and rats. The large amount of NBPF genes in the human genome is most likely due to recent duplications because all of the NBPF genes are so similar and repetitive that they easily recombine with each other, causing duplications. Variation in the number of repetitive sequences in the NBPF genes also varies even within humans. DUF1220 domains also vary greatly from humans in other species in their NBPF proteins. The further away a species is from humans, the fewer DUF1220 domains the species has. Humans have on average 272 DUF1220 domains in their NBPF genes, while chimpanzees have 125, macaques have 35, and dolphins only have 4.

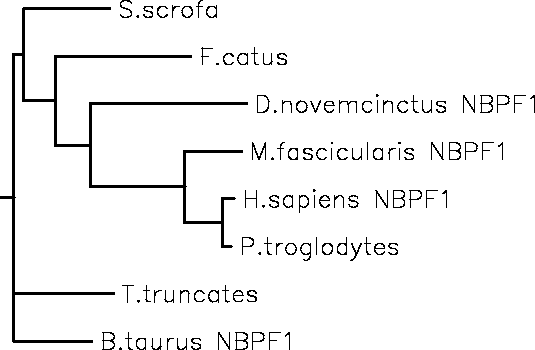
This shows the predicted relationship between NBPF1 similarity based on a multiple sequence alignment.

Selected orthologs of NBPF1

Species	Common name	Time of divergence from humans (mya)	NCBI accession number	Sequence length (amino acids)	Protein similarity to human NBPF1	mRNA similarity to human NBPF1
Homo sapiens	Human	0	AAX85114.1	1214	100%	100%
Pan troglodytes	Chimpanzee	6.3	XP_009439437.1	656	93%	98%
Macaca fascicularis	Crab-eating macaque	29	XP_005544713.1	1173	77%	87%
Tursiops truncatus	Bottle-nosed dolphin	94.2	XP_004329243.1	888	40%	37%
Bos taurus	Cattle	94.2	XP_005197798.1	633	39%	36%
Felis catus	Domestic cat	94.2	XP_011283477.1	813	38%	35%
Sus scrofa	Pig	94.2	XP_005653139.1	567	36%	40%
Dasypus novemcinctus	Nine-banded armadillo	104.2	XP_004469026	934	30%	34%

=== Paralogs ===
The paralogs for NBPF1 are other members of the NBPF protein family. The highest similarity between these paralogs further shows evidence of gene duplication during human evolution.

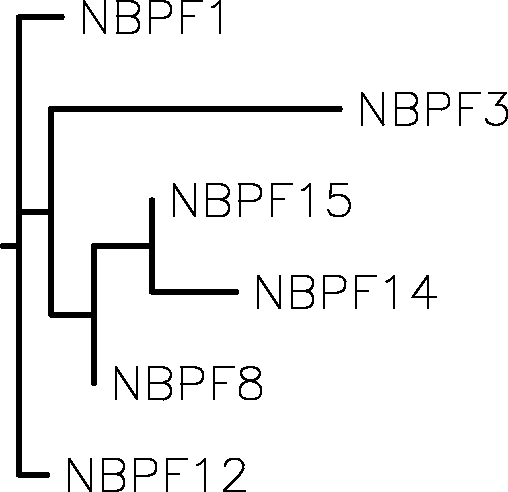
Rooted phylogenetic tree of NBPF1 paralogs based on multiple sequence alignment

Selected paralogs of NBPF1

Gene name	NCBI accession number	Sequence length (amino acids)	Protein sequence identity	Protein sequence similarity
NBPF1	NP_060410.2	1214	100%	100%
NBPF12	NP_001265070.1	1457	100%	93%
NBPF8	NP_001032590.2	942	100%	93%
NBPF14	NP_056198.2	2819	100%	92%
NBPF15	NP_775909.2	670	98%	93%
NBPF3	NP_115640.1	633	100%	75%
