= NBPF19 =

Protein found in humans

Identifiers
- Aliases: NBPF19, NBPF member 19
- External IDs: OMIM: 614006; GeneCards: NBPF19

Gene location (Human)
Chr.	Chromosome 1 (human)
Band	1q21.2	Start	149,475,045 bp
Band	1q21.2	End	149,556,361 bp
RNA expression pattern
Bgee	Human / Mouse (ortholog); Top expressed in: sural nerve; bone marrow cell; monocyte; epithelium of colon; ventricular zone; granulocyte; Achilles tendon; tonsil; gastric mucosa; stromal cell of endometrium / n/a; More reference expression data
BioGPS	n/a
Gene ontology
Molecular function	calcium ion binding; protein binding; Notch binding
Cellular component	cytoplasm; extracellular region; plasma membrane
Biological process	Notch signaling pathway; multicellular organism development; cell differentiation; cerebral cortex development; positive regulation of Notch signaling pathway
Sources:Amigo / QuickGO
Orthologs
Databases	NCBI: entry; OMA: entry
Species	Human	Mouse
Entrez	101060226	n/a
Ensembl	ENSG00000271383	n/a
UniProt	Q7Z3S9	n/a
RefSeq (mRNA)	NM_001351365	n/a
RefSeq (protein)	NP_001350936; NP_001350937	n/a
Location (UCSC)	Chr 1: 149.48 – 149.56 Mb	n/a
PubMed search		n/a
- Wikidata
View/Edit Human

Neuroblastoma breakpoint family member 19, or NBPF19, is a protein that in humans is encoded by the NBPF19 gene. This protein is included in the neuroblastoma breakpoint family of proteins.

== Gene ==
The NBPF19 gene is a protein-encoding gene in humans. It is composed of 80,464 bases including all introns and exons. It is located on the positive strand of chromosome 1 at locus 1q21.2.

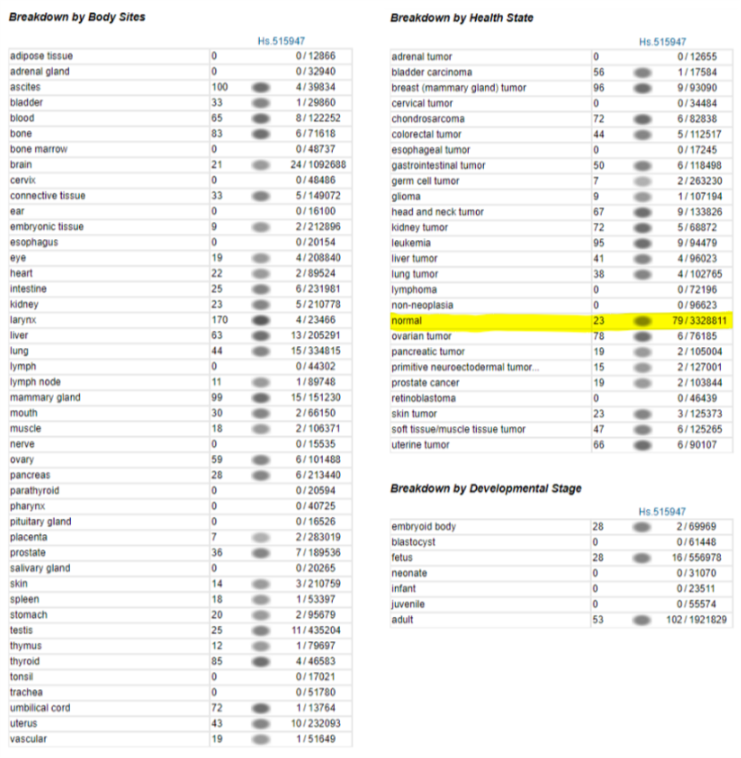
EST profile data of NBPF19 showing tissue and health state expression data

=== Expression ===
EST profiling of NBPF19 shows it to be ubiquitously expressed in most human tissues at unremarkable amounts. It is expressed in relatively higher amounts in the skin, lymphoid organs (lymph nodes, spleen) and the gonads (ovary, testes).

=== Transcript ===
The mRNA transcript of NBPF19 in humans is 13,190 bases long. There are 2 predicted alternative splicing isoforms, although none have been experimentally observed.

== Protein ==
The protein product of the NBPF19 transcript is composed of 3,843 amino acids and weighs 440.5 kD. It contains 45 DUF1220 domains of unknown function but that have been linked to evolutionary changes and generally decrease in number in species increasingly evolutionarily distant from humans.

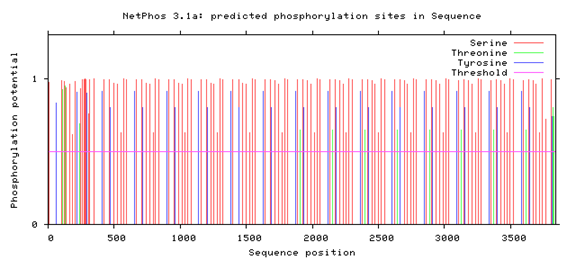
Repetitive phosphorylation pattern of the NBPF19 protein

=== Structure ===
NBPF19 is expected to undergo many post-translational modifications, most notably phosphorylation and sumoylation. The protein is extensively phosphorylated on serine, threonine and tyrosine residues in a repetitive pattern seen in the figure to the left. There are 14 predicted repeats within the protein sequence likely to be sites of sumoylation.

The tertiary structure of NBPF19 is predicted to be roughly 50% coiled-coil and 40% alpha helical. There is no presence of a signal peptide or any transmembrane domains. NBPF19 is likely localized to the nucleus due to the presence of a nuclear localization signal near its 5' terminus.

== Homology ==
NBPF19 is one of 26 identified members of the neuroblastoma breakpoint family of proteins in humans. Sequence similarity among these proteins is largely limited to conservation of DUF1220 domains. The most highly-similar paralogs are listed below:

Selected NBPF19 Paralogs
Gene name	Accession number	Length (aa)	Sequence Identity
NBPF14	NP_056198.2	2819	96%
NBPF20	NP_001265196	5207	93%
NBPF10	CAM23768	4612	93%
NBPF12	NP_001265070.1	1457	92%
NBPF1	NP_060410.2	1214	91%
NBPF26	NP_001338301.1	1366	75%

NBPF19 is not well conserved outside of humans and any notable conservation does not extend past primates and mammals. Select species possess short sequences of similarity and are listed below:

- Pan troglodytes (common chimpanzee)
- Pongo abelii (Sumatran orangutan)
- Piliocolobus tephrosceles (Ugandan red colobus)
- Bos taurus (cow)
- Felis catus (cat)
- Camelus ferus (Bactrian camel)
- Sus scrofa (wild boar)
- Equus asinus (donkey)
