= NBPF15 =

Protein found in humans

Identifiers
- Aliases: NBPF15, AB14, AG3, NBPF16, neuroblastoma breakpoint family member 15, NBPF member 15, MGC8902
- External IDs: OMIM: 610414, 614005; GeneCards: NBPF15

Gene location (Human)
Chr.	Chromosome 1 (human)
Band	1q21.1	Start	144,421,386 bp
Band	1q21.1	End	144,461,674 bp
RNA expression pattern
Bgee	Human / Mouse (ortholog); Top expressed in: ventricular zone; cerebellar hemisphere; thymus; right hemisphere of cerebellum; stromal cell of endometrium; thyroid gland; ganglionic eminence; right lobe of thyroid gland; left lobe of thyroid gland; right lobe of liver / n/a; More reference expression data
BioGPS	n/a
Orthologs
Databases	NCBI: entry; OMA: entry
Species	Human	Mouse
Entrez	284565	n/a
Ensembl	ENSG00000266338	n/a
UniProt	Q8N660	n/a
RefSeq (mRNA)	NM_001102663; NM_001170755; NM_173638	n/a
RefSeq (protein)	NP_001164226; NP_775909	n/a
Location (UCSC)	Chr 1: 144.42 – 144.46 Mb	n/a
PubMed search		n/a
- Wikidata
View/Edit Human

Neuroblastoma breakpoint family, member 15, also known as NBPF15, is a protein which in humans is encoded by the NBPF15 gene. The gene is 18762 bp long, with mRNA that is 3837 bp long. The gene is located on chromosome 1q21.1. Its sub-cellular location is predicted to be in the nucleus and cytoplasm. It contains what is known as the NBPF repeat, which is a two-exon stretch of sequence that is characteristic of all 21 members of the NBPF gene family. The repeat is considered the ancestral exons, and the NBPF family has been linked to primate evolution.

== Function ==
The function of NBPF16 is not fully understood. It is a member of the NBPF family of proteins, which have been linked to possible roles in oncogenesis and tumor suppressor genes.

== Protein ==
The protein is composed of 670 amino acids. The gene contains five domains of unknown function, called DUF1220. DUF1220 domains are found in all members of the NBPF gene family, although the number differs between each member. Repetitive structure with high intergenic and intragenic sequence conservation, both in coding and noncoding regions. Makes it possible for homologous recombination to occur easily between different alleles. The repetitiveness of it, and the other members of the NBPF gene family is thought to have arisen from segmental duplications on chromosome 1.

=== Predicted properties ===
Properties of NBPF16 that were predicted using bioinformatics tools:

- Molecular weight: 76 kD
- Isoelectric point: 4.43
- Post-translational modification: none predicted.
- No predicted signal peptide or signal peptide cleavage site.
- No interacting proteins or binding partners.

=== Expression ===
There is little to no expression data available for the gene, but most indications point to it being ubiquitously expressed throughout the body.

== Homology ==
=== Orthologs ===
There exists no great orthologs outside of primates. These orthologs were gathered from BLAT. and BLAST searches

Species	Organism common name	Sequence identity	Sequence similarity	Length (AAs)
Homo sapiens	Human	100%	100%	670
Pan troglodytes	Chimpanzee	90%	92%	509
Macaca mulatta	Rhesus macaque	57%	68%	620
Gallus gallus	Chicken	36%	54%	1394
Rattus norvegicus	Norway rat	34%	67%	2324
Bos taurus	Cattle	34%	50%	816
Xenopus laevis	African clawed frog	33%	52%	728
Mus musculus	House mouse	32%	55%	2446

=== Paralogs ===
Due to there being 21 other members of the NBPF gene family, there are 21 paralogs of NBPF16. They all show high conservation and repetitive structures.
