= BUB3 =

Protein-coding gene in the species Homo sapiens

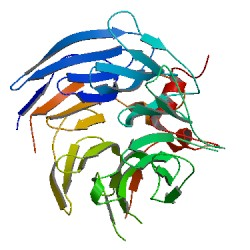

Identifiers
- Aliases: BUB3, BUB3L, hmitotic checkpoint protein, BUB3 mitotic checkpoint protein
- External IDs: OMIM: 603719; MGI: 1343463; GeneCards: BUB3

Gene location (Human)
Chr.	Chromosome 10 (human)
Band	10q26.13	Start	123,154,402 bp
Band	10q26.13	End	123,170,467 bp

Gene location (Mouse)
Chr.	Chromosome 7 (mouse)
Band	7 F3|7 74.36 cM	Start	131,161,951 bp
Band	7 F3|7 74.36 cM	End	131,173,624 bp
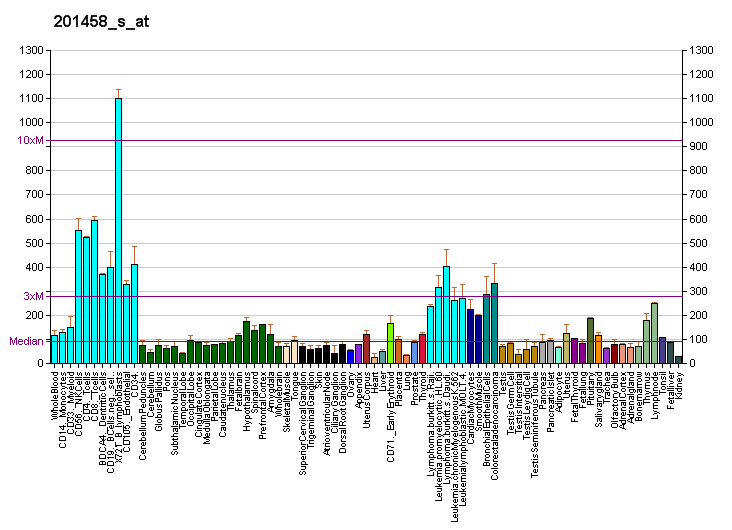

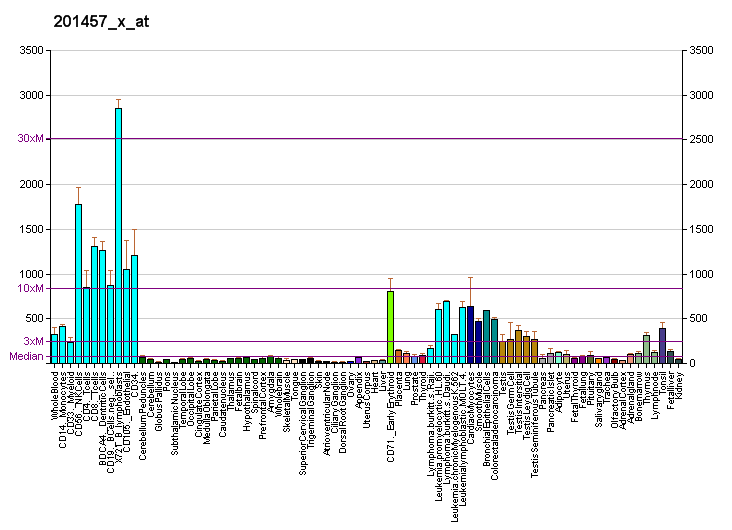

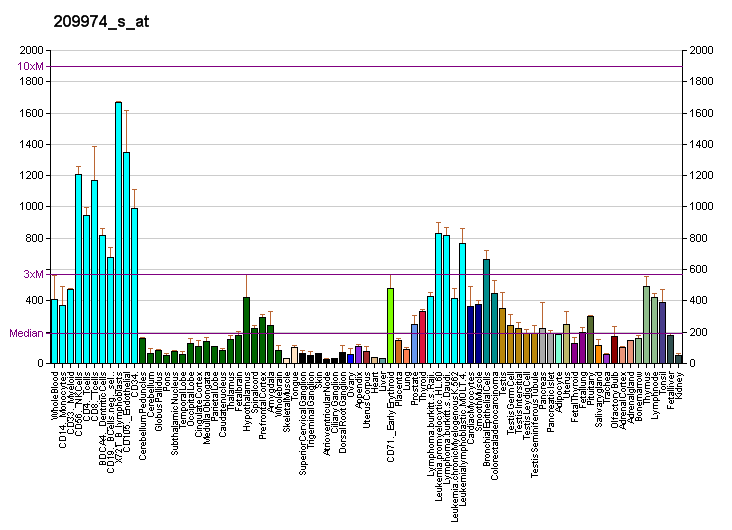
RNA expression pattern
Bgee	Human / Mouse (ortholog); Top expressed in: gingival epithelium; sperm; epithelium of nasopharynx; germinal epithelium; Epithelium of choroid plexus; ventricular zone; lymph node; embryo; ganglionic eminence; gonad / Top expressed in: vestibular sensory epithelium; primitive streak; maxillary prominence; mandibular prominence; abdominal wall; stria vascularis; medial ganglionic eminence; endocardial cushion; condyle; somite; More reference expression data
BioGPS	More reference expression data
Gene ontology
Molecular function	protein binding; ubiquitin binding
Cellular component	cytosol; chromosome; nucleoplasm; chromosome, centromeric region; nucleus; kinetochore; mitotic checkpoint complex; bub1-bub3 complex
Biological process	chromosome segregation; cell division; regulation of chromosome segregation; meiosis; mitotic sister chromatid segregation; cell cycle; anaphase-promoting complex-dependent catabolic process; attachment of spindle microtubules to kinetochore; mitotic spindle assembly checkpoint signaling; protein localization to kinetochore; regulation of mitotic cell cycle phase transition; ubiquitin-dependent protein catabolic process
Sources:Amigo / QuickGO
Orthologs
Databases	NCBI: entry; OMA: entry
Species	Human	Mouse
Entrez	9184	12237
Ensembl	ENSG00000154473	ENSMUSG00000066979
UniProt	O43684	Q9WVA3
RefSeq (mRNA)	NM_004725; NM_001007793	NM_009774; NM_001317350
RefSeq (protein)	NP_001007794; NP_004716	NP_001304279; NP_033904
Location (UCSC)	Chr 10: 123.15 – 123.17 Mb	Chr 7: 131.16 – 131.17 Mb
PubMed search
- Wikidata
View/Edit Human	View/Edit Mouse

Mitotic checkpoint protein BUB3 is a protein that in humans is encoded by the BUB3 gene.

Bub3 is a protein involved with the regulation of the Spindle Assembly Checkpoint (SAC); though BUB3 is non-essential in yeast, it is essential in higher eukaryotes. As one of the checkpoint proteins, Bub3 delays the irreversible onset of anaphase through direction of kinetochore localization during prometaphase to achieve biorientation. In directing the kinetochore-microtubule interaction, this ensures the proper (and consequently, bioriented) attachment of the chromosomes prior to anaphase. Bub3 and its related proteins that form the Spindle Assembly Checkpoint (SAC) inhibit the action of the Anaphase Promoting Complex (APC), preventing early anaphase entry and mitotic exit; this serves as a mechanism for the fidelity of chromosomal segregation.

== Function ==
Bub3 is a crucial component in the formation of the mitotic spindle assembly complex, which forms a complex with other important proteins. For correct segregation of the cells it is necessary for all mitotic spindles to attach correctly to the kinetochore of each chromosome. This is controlled by the mitotic spindle checkpoint complex which operates as a feedback-response. If there is a signal of a defect in the attachment, mitosis will be stopped to ensure that all chromosomes have an amphitelic binding to spindles. After the error is corrected, the cell will proceed to anaphase. The complex of proteins which regulate the cell arrest are BUB1, BUB2, BUB3 (this protein), Mad1, Mad2, Mad3 and MPS1.

== Role in the spindle assembly checkpoint ==
At unattached kinetochores, a complex consisting of BubR1, Bub3, and Cdc20 interact with the Mad2-Cdc20 complex to inhibit the APC, thus inhibiting the formation of active APC^{Cdc20}. Bub3 binds constitutively to BubR1; in this arrangement, Bub3 acts as a key component of the SAC in the formation of an inhibitory complex. Securin and cyclin B are also stabilized before the anaphase transition by the unattached kinetochores. The stabilization of cyclin and securin prevent the degradation that would lead to the irreversible and fast separation of the sister chromatids.

The formation of these "inhibitory complexes" and steps feed into a 'wait' signal before activation of separase; at the stage prior to anaphase, securin inhibits the activity of separase and maintains the cohesion complex.

== Structure ==
The crystal structure of Bub3 indicates a protein of the seven-bladed beta-propeller structure with the presence of WD40 repeats, with each blade formed by four anti-parallel beta sheet strands that have been organized around a tapered channel. Mutation data suggest several important surfaces of interaction for the formation of the SAC, particularly the conserved tryptophans (in blades 1 and 3) and the conserved VAVE sequences in blade 5.

Rae1 (an mRNA export factor), another member of the WD40 protein family, shows high sequence conservation with that of Bub3. Both bind to Gle2p-binding-sequence (GLEBS) motifs; while Bub3 specifically binds Mad3 and Bub1, Rae1 has more promiscuous binding as it binds both the nuclear pore complex and Bub1. This indicates a similarity in interaction of Bub3 and Rae1 with Bub1.

== Interactions ==
BUB3 has been shown to interact with BUB1B, HDAC1 and Histone deacetylase 2.

Bub3 has been shown to form complexes with Mad1-Bub1 and with Cdc20 (the interaction of which does not require intact kinetochores). Additionally, it has been shown to bind Mad2 and Mad3.

Bub3 directs the localization of Bub1 at the kinetochore in order to activate the SAC. In both Saccharomyces cerevisiae and metazoans, Bub3 has been shown to bind BubR1 and Bub1.

The components that are essential for the spindle assembly checkpoint in yeast have been determined to be Bub1, Bub3, Mad1, Mad2, Mad3, and the increasingly important Mps1 (a protein kinase).

== Regulation ==
When the SAC is activated, the production of the Bub3-Cdc20 complex is activated. After kinetochore attachment is complete, the spindle checkpoint complexes (including the BubR1-Bub3) experience a decrease in concentration.

Bub3 also acts as a regulator in that it affects binding of Mad3 to Mad2.

Structural and sequence analysis indicated the existence of three conserved regions that are referred to as WD40 repeats. Mutation of one of these motifs has indicated an impaired ability of Bub3 to interact with Mad2, Mad3, and Cdc20. The structural data suggested that Bub3 acts as a platform that mediates the interaction of SAC protein complexes.

== Clinical significance ==
BUB3 forms a complex with BUB1 (BUB1/BUB3 complex) to inhibit the anaphase-promoting complex or cyclosome (APC/C) as soon as the spindle-assembly checkpoint is activated. BUB3 also phosphorylates:

- CDC20 (activator) and thereby inhibits the ubiquitin ligase activity of APC/C.
- MAD1L1, which usually interacts with BUB1 and BUBR1, and in turn the BUB1/BUB3 complex interacts with MAD1L1.

Another function of BUB3 is to promote correct kinetochore-microtubule (K-MT) attachments when the spindle-assembly checkpoint is active. It plays a role in the localization of kinetochore of BUB1.

BUB3 serves in oocyte meiosis as the regulator of chromosome segregation.

Defects in BUB3 in the cell cycle can contribute to the following diseases:

- hepatocellular carcinoma
- gastric cancer
- breast cancer
- cervical cancer
- adenomatous polyposis
- osteosarcoma familial breast cancer
- glioblastoma cervicitis
- lung cancer carcinoma
- Coli polyposis
