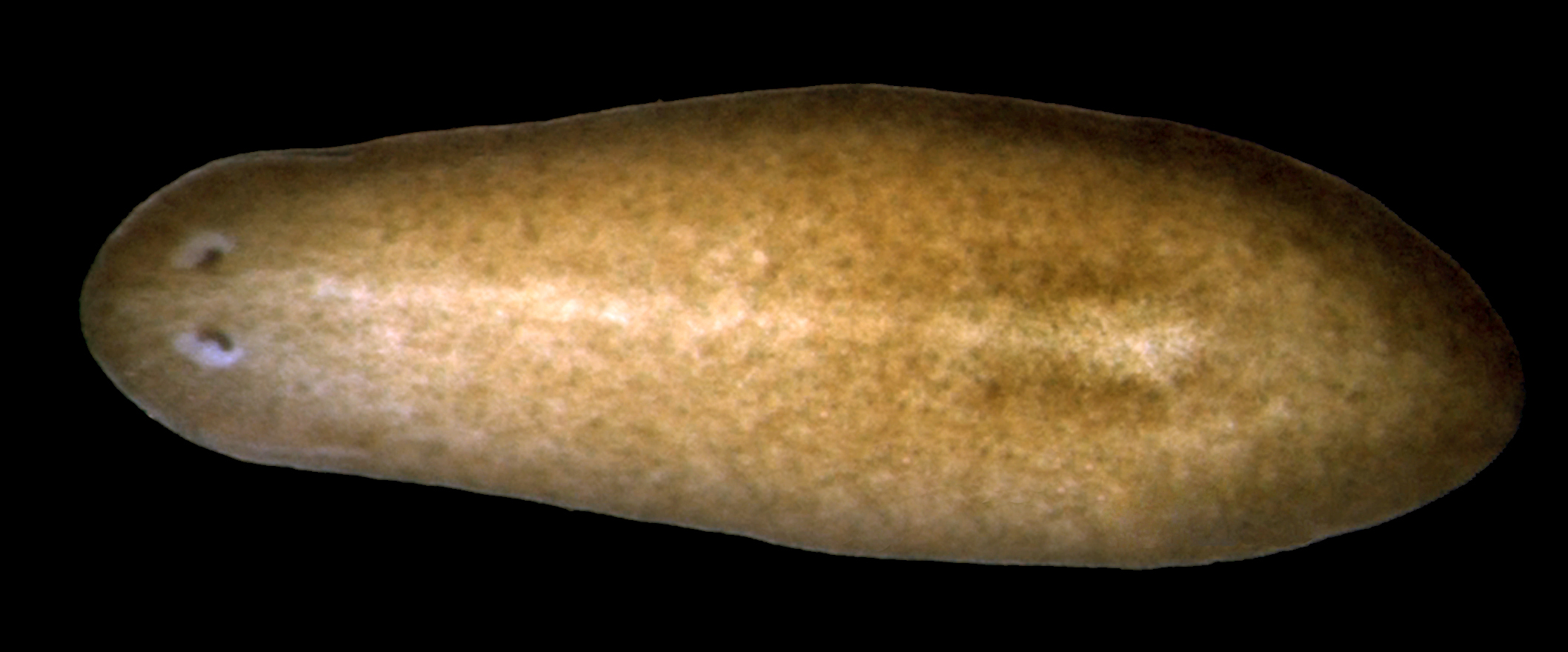

Scientific classification
- Kingdom: Animalia
- Phylum: Platyhelminthes
- Order: Tricladida
- Family: Dugesiidae
- Genus: Schmidtea
- Species: S. mediterranea

Binomial name
- Schmidtea mediterranea Benazzi, Baguñà, Ballester, Puccinelli & Del Papa, 1975
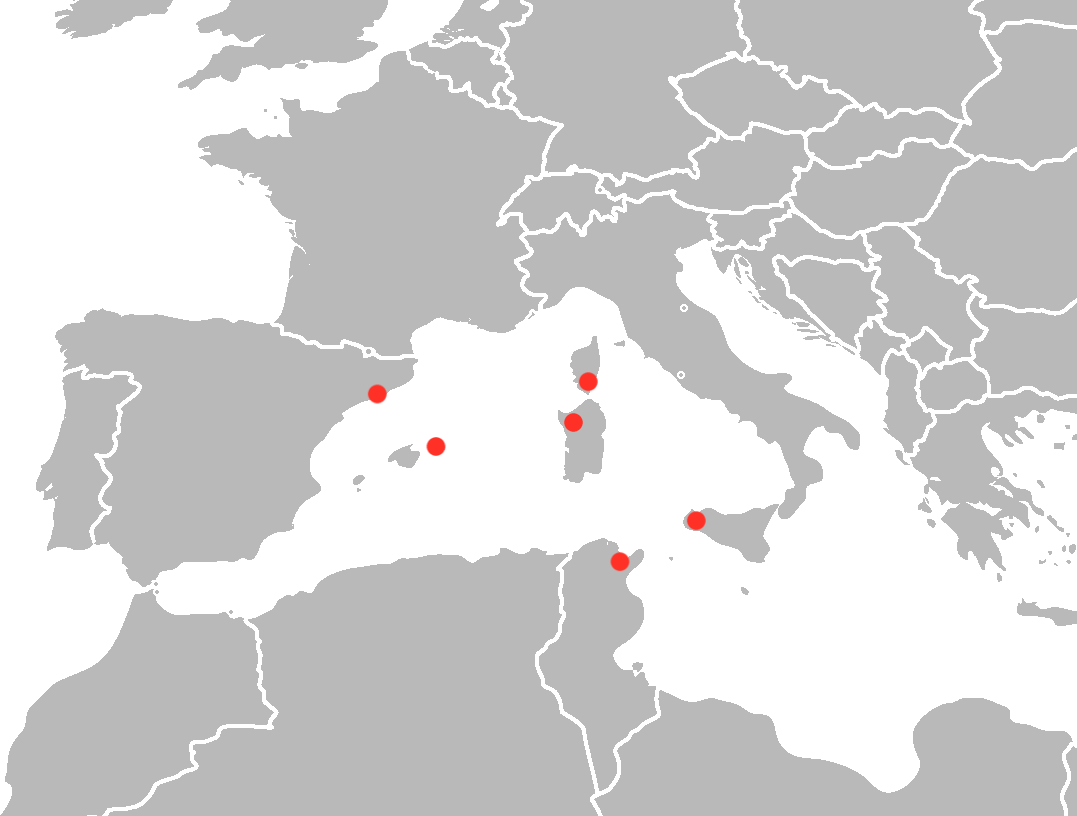
- Distribution of S. mediterranea (Western Mediterranean)

Synonyms
- Dugesia mediterranea Benazzi, Baguñà, Ballester, Puccinelli & Del Papa, 1975

= Schmidtea mediterranea =

Species of worm

Schmidtea mediterranea is a freshwater triclad (planarian) that lives in southern Europe and Tunisia. It is a model for regeneration, stem cells and development of tissues such as the brain and germline. It is known to be "highly regenerative" with the whole body being regeneratable.

== Distribution ==
Schmidtea mediterranea is found in some coastal areas and islands in the western Mediterranean (Catalonia, Menorca, Mallorca, Corsica, Sardinia, Sicily and Tunisia).

== Ecology ==
High water temperatures of 25–27 °C have deleterious effects on populations of S. mediterranea, while this species tolerates variations in the acidity of the water (pH 6.9–8.9) without a noticeable influence on their survival.

S. mediterranea can be found with associated fauna such as gastropods, bivalves, insects, leeches, and nematodes.

== Reproduction ==
The sexual specimens of Schmidtea mediterranea produce cocoons between November and April. In May, when water temperature rises above 20 °C, they lose their reproductive apparatus. Despite this, they don't reproduce asexually (by fissiparity) during the summer months.

== Regeneration ==
Almost any piece from a Schmidtea mediterranea individual can regenerate an entire organism in a few days. This is in part enabled by the presence of abundant adult pluripotent stem cells called neoblasts. Transplantation of a single neoblast to a fatally injured animal has been shown to rescue the animal. Stem cells are intercalated between gut branches. Their niche lies between the intestine and the surface epithilium.

During regeneration, stem cells appear in proximity to mmp-1^{+} secretory hecatonoblasts and porcupine^{+} intestinal cells. The hecatonoblasts are dispensable while the intestinal cells are required. Unusually, the intestinal cells do not tend to be in direct contact with the stem cells that they control (or have any cell-cell junctions), a control scheme unusual among invertebrate stem cells.

== Genome ==
A long-read genome of S. mediterranea was sequenced in 2018. Despite the 17 rounds of inbreeding, the resulting genome remained highly heterozygous, suggesting that meiotic recombination is inefficient in this species. The genome has a repetitive fraction of 61.7%. Planarian genomes in general have been difficult to assemble from short-read sequencing due to the heterozygousity, high AT content, resistance to standard DNA isolation procedures, and repeat content. There are a few previously unknown family of long terminal repeats that the author named SLF (S. mediterranea LTR family) followed by a number.

Like other flatworms, S. mediterranea shows the loss of many genes that are essential to humans and mice. As with all sequenced flatworms (as of 2018), it has no recognizable form of the fatty acid synthase FASN gene, which is essential for de novo fatty acid synthesis in eukaryotes. The heme breakdown genes HMOX1 and BLVRB are missing in this worm while the heme biosynthesis pathway is known to be present from in vivo experiments. The double-strand break repair pathway is missing many parts, which on one hand makes sense given the structural divergence and repeat content of the genome, but on the other hand is unusual given the worm's resistance to γ-radiation.

Also unusual is the lack of identifiable MAD1 and MAD2 genes, thought to be essential components of the spindle assembly checkpoint (SAC). However, an SAC-like function is known to occur in planarians, as Dugesia dorotocephala displays M-phase arrest upon colchicine interference of spindle function. Additional work shows that the APC/C-CDC20 remains in control of cell cycle and RZZ complex remains in control of APC/C-CDC20 despite the absence of MAD1/2.
