= BUB1 =

Protein found in humans

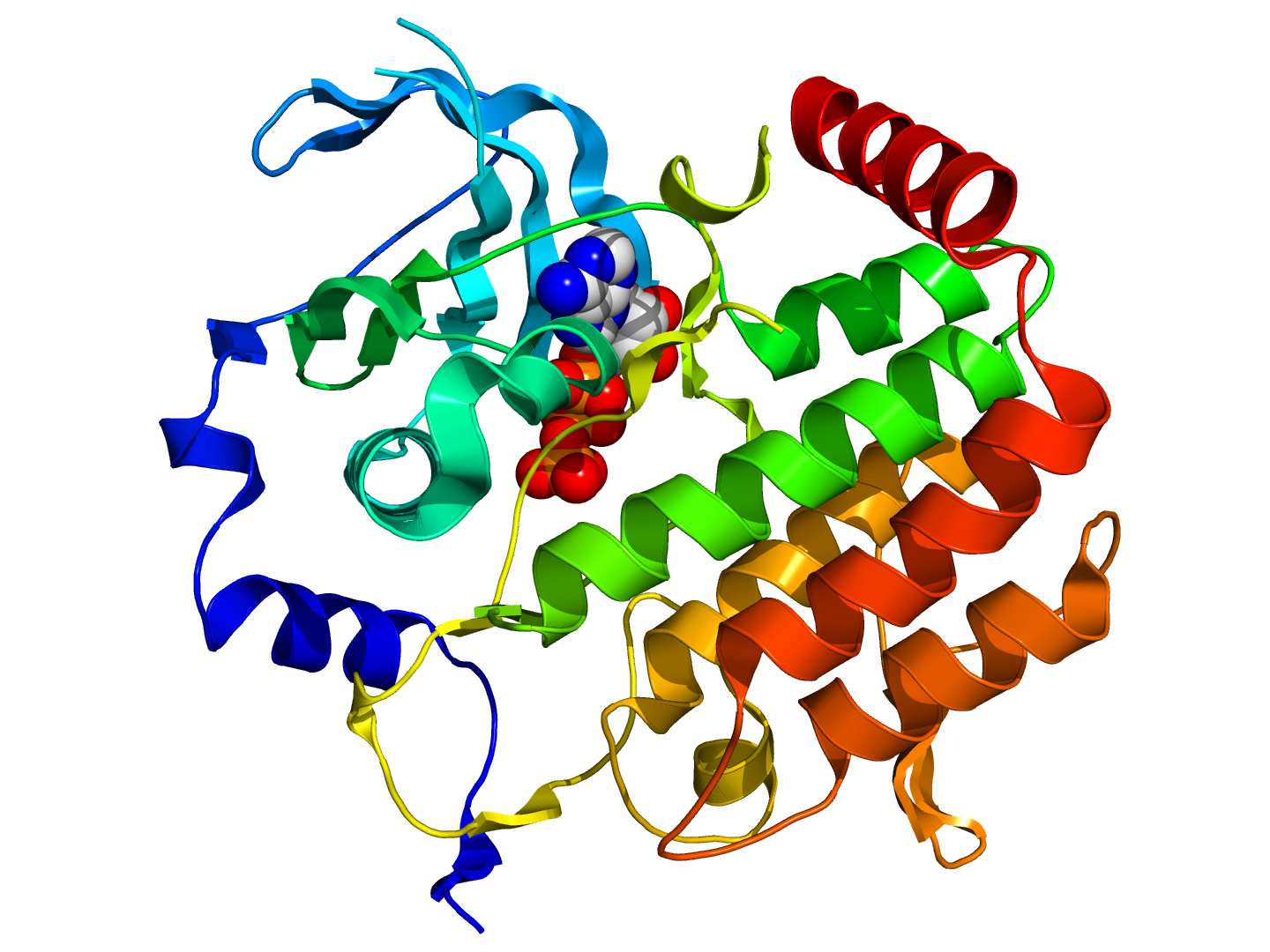

Identifiers
- Aliases: BUB1, BUB1A, BUB1L, hBUB1 mitotic checkpoint serine/threonine kinase
- External IDs: OMIM: 602452; MGI: 1100510; GeneCards: BUB1
Available structures
PDB	Ortholog search: PDBe RCSB
PDB	List of PDB id codes 2LAH, 4A1G, 4QPM, 4R8Q, 5DMZ
Enzyme activity
EC #	BRENDA	ExPASy	KEGG	MetaCyc
2.7.11.1	↗	↗	↗	↗

Gene location (Human)
Chr.	Chromosome 2 (human)
Band	2q13	Start	110,637,528 bp
Band	2q13	End	110,678,063 bp

Gene location (Mouse)
Chr.	Chromosome 2 (mouse)
Band	2 F1|2 62.1 cM	Start	127,643,036 bp
Band	2 F1|2 62.1 cM	End	127,673,785 bp
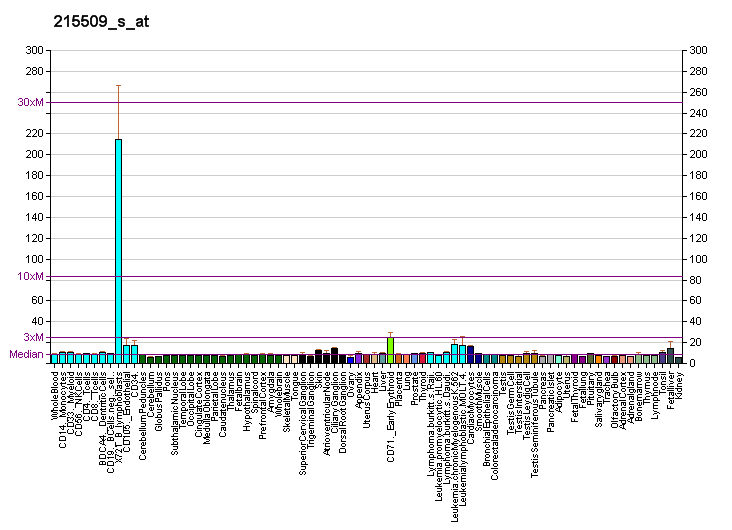

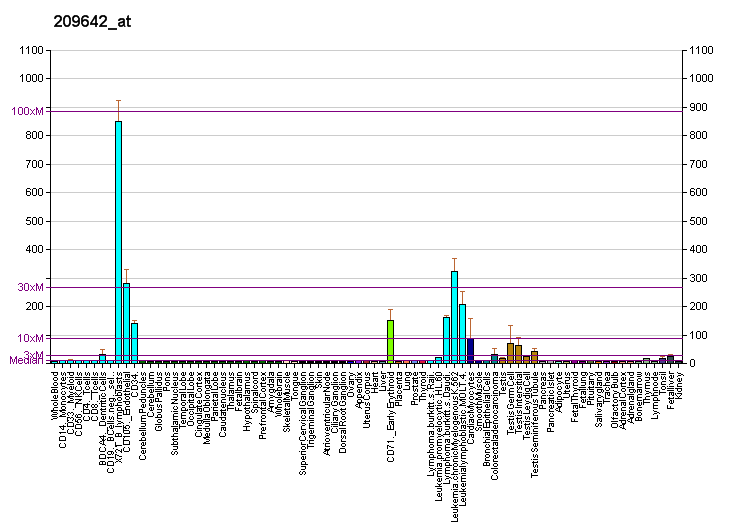
RNA expression pattern
Bgee	Human / Mouse (ortholog); Top expressed in: ventricular zone; gonad; ganglionic eminence; right testis; left testis; secondary oocyte; testicle; bone marrow cell; mucosa of transverse colon; trabecular bone / Top expressed in: tail of embryo; genital tubercle; abdominal wall; epiblast; primitive streak; otic placode; mandibular prominence; dermis; maxillary prominence; spermatid; More reference expression data
BioGPS	More reference expression data
Gene ontology
Molecular function	transferase activity; protein kinase activity; nucleotide binding; kinase activity; protein serine/threonine kinase activity; protein binding; ATP binding
Cellular component	membrane; nucleoplasm; chromosome; chromosome, centromeric region; nucleus; kinetochore; cytosol
Biological process	phosphorylation; chromosome segregation; mitotic cell cycle checkpoint signaling; cell division; regulation of chromosome segregation; protein phosphorylation; cell cycle; regulation of sister chromatid cohesion; cell population proliferation; viral process; apoptotic process; sister chromatid cohesion; meiotic sister chromatid cohesion, centromeric; mitotic spindle assembly checkpoint signaling
Sources:Amigo / QuickGO
Orthologs
Databases	NCBI: entry; OMA: entry
Species	Human	Mouse
Entrez	699	12235
Ensembl	ENSG00000169679	ENSMUSG00000027379
UniProt	O43683	O08901
RefSeq (mRNA)	NM_001278616; NM_001278617; NM_004336	NM_001113179; NM_009772
RefSeq (protein)	NP_001265545; NP_001265546; NP_004327	NP_001106650; NP_033902
Location (UCSC)	Chr 2: 110.64 – 110.68 Mb	Chr 2: 127.64 – 127.67 Mb
PubMed search
- Wikidata
View/Edit Human	View/Edit Mouse

Mitotic checkpoint serine/threonine-protein kinase BUB1 also known as BUB1 (budding uninhibited by benzimidazoles 1) is an enzyme that in humans is encoded by the BUB1 gene.

Bub1 is a serine/threonine protein kinase first identified in genetic screens of Saccharomyces cerevisiae (baker's yeast). The protein is bound to kinetochores and plays a key role in the establishment of the mitotic spindle checkpoint and chromosome congression. The mitotic checkpoint kinase is evolutionarily conserved in organisms as diverse as S. cerevisiae and humans. Loss-of-function mutations or absence of Bub1 has been reported to result in aneuploidy, chromosomal instability (CIN) and premature senescence.

== Structure ==
Bub1p comprises a conserved N-terminal region, a central non-conserved region and a C-terminal serine/threonine kinase domain. The N-terminal region mediates binding of Hs-BUB1 to the mitotic kinetochore protein blinkin (a protein also commonly referred to as AF15q14). The latter interaction is essential for kinetochore localization of Bub1 and its function in cell cycle arrest induced by spindle assembly checkpoint (SAC) activation. The crystal structure of human Bub1 revealed the presence of a N-terminal tetratricopeptide repeat (TPR) domain and a C-terminal kinase domain (residues 784–1085), adopting a canonical kinase fold with two lobes. The ATP binding and the catalytic sites are located at the interface of the two lobes. The N-terminal extension contains three β-strands and an α-helix, wrapping around the N lobe of the kinase domain.

== Subcellular location ==
In humans Bub1 accumulates gradually during G1 and S phase of the cell cycle, peaks at G2/M, and drops dramatically after mitosis. During prophase it localizes as one of the first proteins to the outer kinetochore, a process generally implicated in correct mitotic timing and checkpoint response to spindle damage.

== Function ==
The protein kinase Bub1 possesses versatile and distinct functions during the cell cycle, mainly in the SAC and chromosome alignment during metaphase. The protein's interaction network currently identified is similarly complex (see Figure 1).

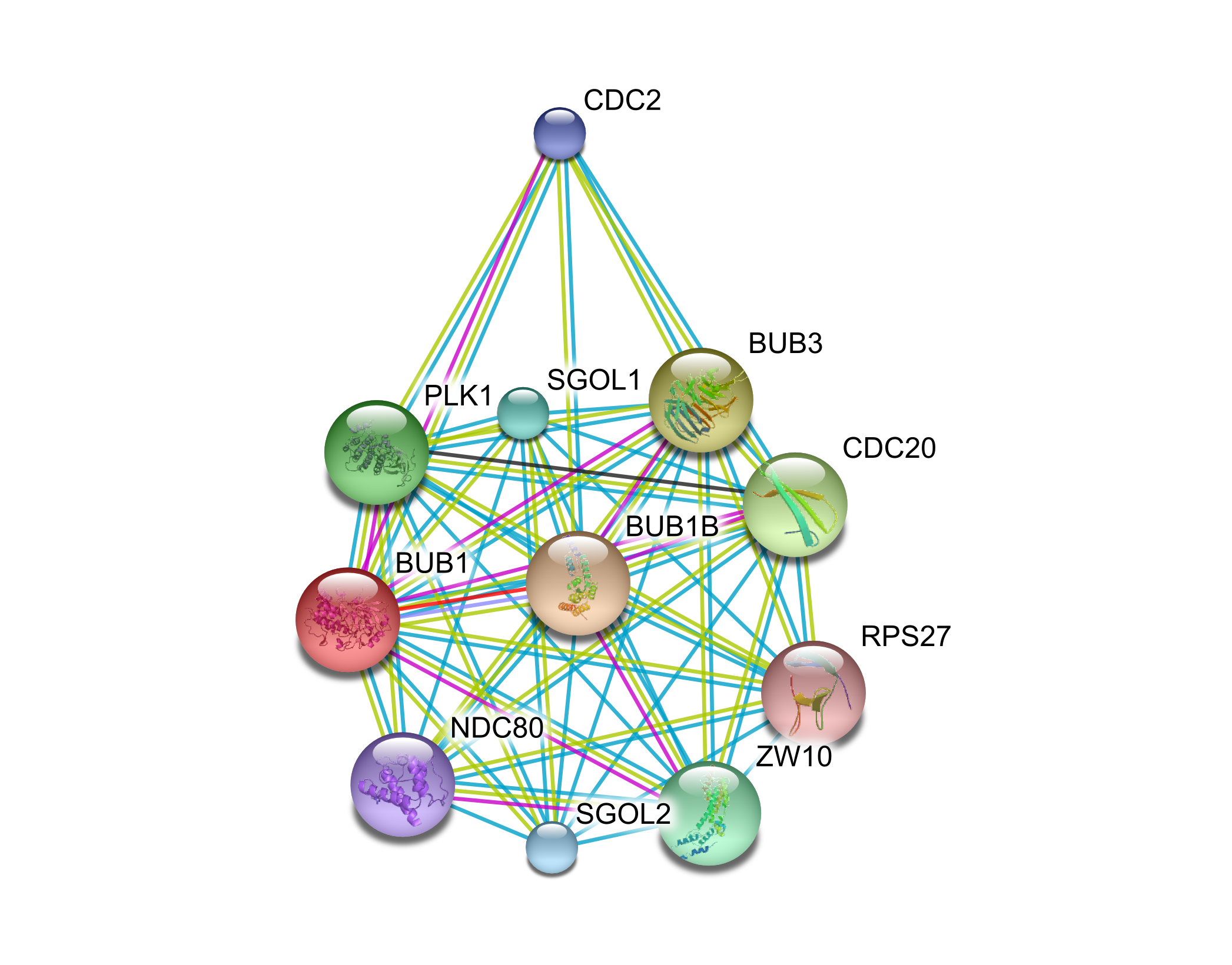
Figure 1: Protein interaction network of human Bub1

In eukaryotic cells the SAC serves as the central surveillance mechanism to ensure chromosomes are being passed on to the next generation in a reliable manner. Several components monitor correct bipolar attachment of microtubules to the kinetochore, presumably through detection of tension. Metaphase-to-anaphase transition is halted by the SAC as long as single kinetochores lack bipolar microtubule attachment, implying the need for a highly sensitive signaling pathway. Bub1 was claimed to be the master regulator of SAC formation and signaling. At least thirteen other proteins (Mad1, MAD2, MAD3/BubR1, BUB3, Mps1 etc.) are part of the check point, among which many have been identified to interact with Bub1.

Upon activation of the SAC Bub1 directly phosphorylates APC/C's coactivator Cdc20. This phosphorylation event is probably achieved in complex with Bub3, which itself has been subjected to prior phosphorylation by Bub1. The phosphorylation of Cdc20 ultimately leads to decreased activity of APC/C which determines the metaphase-to-anaphase transition. In turn APC/C, now in complex with Cdh1, also acts on Bub1 by priming it for degradation to exit mitosis.

In addition, kinetochore localization of Bub1 early during G2 or prophase is another aspect of SAC functioning. Bub1 is thought to serve as a platform recruiting other checkpoint and motor proteins as Mad1, Mad2, BubR1, CENP-E and PLK1 to the kinetochore. Indeed, recent data suggest that the primary role of Bub1 during SAC activity is not Cdc20 phosphorylation but rather recruitment of BubR1, Mad1 and Mad2.

Upon spindle damage Bub1 is also triggered to phosphorylate Mad1 leading to dissociation of the Mad1-Mad2 complex and thereby rendering Mad2 accessible for inhibition of Cdc20. Bub1 generally protects sister chromatide cohesion by enhancing Shugoshin protein (Sgo1) localization to the centromeric region. Through recruitment of the phosphatase PP2A Bub1 inhibits the action of PLK1, which removes Sgo1 from the centromere.

Contrarily PLK1 localization, as mentioned, also depends on the activity of Bub1. Studies in Xenopus extracts using RNAi or antibody depletion have indicated a crucial function of Bub1 in the organization of the inner centromere. Similarly to its role in kinetochore assembly, it recruits members of the chromosomal passenger complex (CPC) like Aurora B kinase, Survivin and INCENP. Direct phosphorylation of INCENP by Bub1 has been observed.

RNAi mediated depletion of human Bub1 has indicated function in correct metaphase congression. Downstream targets identified are distinct kinetochore proteins as CENP-F, MCAK and the mentioned Sgo1.

== Implications in cancer ==
Disturbed mitotic checkpoints are a common feature of many human cancers. More precisely, mutations in the spindle checkpoint can lead to chromosomal instability and aneuploidy, a feature present in over 90% of all solid tumors. Loss-of-function mutations or reduced gene expression of Bub1 have been identified in several human tumors as colon, esophageal, gastric, breast cancer and melanoma. A correlation between Bub1 expression levels and the localization of tumors along with their severity was found. For instance, low Bub1 expression levels resulted in more sarcomas, lymphomas and lung tumors, whereas higher ones caused sarcomas and tumors in the liver. Moreover, Bub1 has been identified as a target of the large T antigen of the SV-40 virus, possibly contributing to its potential for oncogenic transformation. Indications for possible Bub1 involvement in tumorigenesis also derive from animal experiments, where mice with reduced Bub1 expression showed an increase in tumor susceptibility. In vitro knockdown of Bub1 in p53 impaired cells (e.g. HeLa cells) caused aneuploidy. Whether aneuploidy alone is a sufficient driving cause during tumorigenesis or rather a mere consequence has been a matter of scientific debate.

== Link to caspase-independent mitotic death (CIMD) ==
Recently Bub1 has been identified as a negative regulator of CIMD. Depletion of Bub1 results in increased CIMD in order to avoid aneuploidy caused by reduced SAC functioning. The transcriptional activity of p73 is thereby inhibited via phosphorylation. Direct interaction between these two players has not been visualized so far, therefore molecules linking Bub1 and p73 are yet to be determined. It has also been proposed that Bub1 binds p53 to prevent it from activating pro-apoptotic genes, therefore p53 is able to induce apoptosis when Bub1 is depleted. However, an interaction between p53 and Bub1 has not yet been shown while p53 binding BubR1 has been reported.

== See also ==
- Mitosis
- Cell Cycle
