= Mad2 =

Essential spindle checkpoint protein

Mitotic spindle checkpoint component Mad2

Identifiers
- Organism: S. cerevisiae S288c
- Symbol: Mad2
- Alt. symbols: YJL030W
- Entrez: 853422
- Orthologs: NCBI: entry; OMA: entry
- RefSeq (mRNA): NM_001181464
- RefSeq (Prot): NP_012504
- UniProt: P40958

Other data
- Chromosome: X: 0.39 - 0.39 Mb
Search for
- Structures: Swiss-model
- Domains: InterPro

Mad2 (mitotic arrest deficient 2) is an essential spindle checkpoint protein. The spindle checkpoint system is a regulatory system that restrains progression through the metaphase-to-anaphase transition. The Mad2 gene was first identified in the yeast S. cerevisiae in a screen for genes which when mutated would confer sensitivity to microtubule poisons. The human orthologues of Mad2 (MAD2L1 and MAD2L2) were first cloned in a search for human cDNAs that would rescue the microtubule poison-sensitivity of a yeast strain in which a kinetochore binding protein was missing. The protein was shown to be present at unattached kinetochores and antibody inhibition studies demonstrated it was essential to execute a block in the metaphase-to-anaphase transition in response to the microtubule poison nocodazole. Subsequent cloning of the Xenopus laevis ortholog, facilitated by the sharing of the human sequence, allowed for the characterization of the mitotic checkpoint in egg extracts.

== Metaphase-to-anaphase transition ==
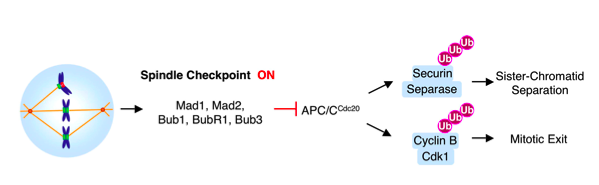
In response to kinetochores that are not bi-oriented, the checkpoint is turned on. APC/Cdc20 remains inactive preventing securin destruction and separase activation.

Progression from metaphase to anaphase is marked by sister chromatid separation. The cell cycle surveillance mechanism that prevents sister-chromatid separation and transition into anaphase is called the spindle checkpoint. As a safeguard against chromosome segregation errors, the spindle assembly checkpoint (SAC) delays anaphase until all sister chromatid pairs have become bipolarly attached.

Once microtubules attach to kinetochores, chromosomes are aligned on the metaphase plate, and proper bi-orientation has been achieved, the SAC stopping mechanisms are removed. Entrance into anaphase is mediated by APCCdc20 activation. APCCdc20 is a ubiquitin-protein ligase that tags the protein, securin, for destruction. Securin destruction liberates and activates its bound protease partner, separase. Separase bound to securin remains inhibited; however, when inhibition is relieved, activated separase cleaves the cohesin complex which links the sister chromatids together.

Without Cdc20, the anaphase-promoting complex (APC) cannot become activated and anaphase is not triggered. Mad2 was shown to inhibit the activity of the APC by direct physical interaction in a ternary complex with Cdc20. Kinetochores that remain unattached to microtubules catalyze the sequestration of Cdc20 by Mad2. In fact, when metaphase mammalian cells are treated with the spindle-depolymerizing agent nocodazole, Mad2 proteins become localized at the kinetochores of all sister-chromatid pairs.

== Mad2 conformers ==
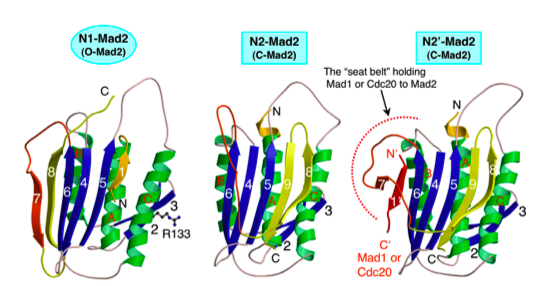

Mad2 is capable of forming multimers and adopts at least two structural conformations. Open Mad2 differs from closed Mad2 in the positioning of the 50 residue C-terminal segment. This “safety belt” is held tightly against the right side of the protein in the open conformation. Upon loosening, the safety belt can be re-positioned around a binding partner. In the closed conformation, the safety belt wraps around the bound ligand and interacts with a different region of Mad2. Binding partners of Mad2 include either Cdc20 or Mad1. Mad1 and Cdc20 bind Mad2 in an identical fashion. Mad2 uses the same site to bind either Mad1 or Cdc20 and, thus, can only bind one of the two proteins at a time.

== Mad2 activation in the spindle assembly checkpoint ==
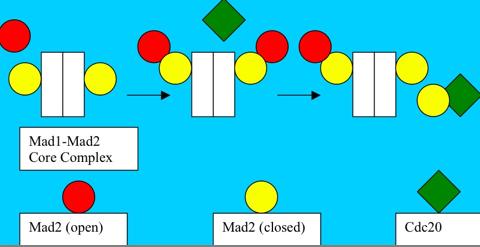
Template Model: Mad2 already bound to Mad1 is the receptor for free Open Mad2. Open Mad2 binds Cdc20 and then dissociates and can “breed” further Closed Mad2:Cdc20 halt signals.

Since unattached kinetochores establish and maintain the SAC, Mad2 is recruited to prevent these misaligned sister chromatids from separating. When the checkpoint/braking process is activated, Mad2 binds Mad1 to form Closed-Mad2-Mad1 complexes. Given that Mad1:Mad2 is a stable complex and Cdc20 and Mad1 bind Mad 2 in the very same binding site, it is highly unlikely that Closed Mad2 releases Mad1 to bind Cdc20.

A model, which accounts for Mad2 adopting a conformation capable of binding Cdc20, relies upon the formation of Mad1-Mad2 core complex first. In this model, external Open Mad2 is recruited to the Mad1:Mad2 template. This Mad1:Mad2 interaction is thought to enable a conformational change which allows the peripherally bound Open Mad2 to interact with Cdc20. Cdc20:Mad2 then dissociates and Mad1:Mad2 is enabled to bind a free cytosolic Mad2 again.

It is speculated that once formed, Cdc20:Mad2 complexes can amplify the anaphase wait signal by stimulating further conversion of cytosolic Open Mad2 and free Cdc20 into more Cdc20:Closed Mad2 complexes. This diffusible signal propagation away from the kinetochore complexes could account for how vacancy of just one tiny kinetochore site can completely shut down the metaphase-to-anaphase transition.

== Future work ==
Much remains to be explained about spindle checkpoint signaling and the contribution of other spindle checkpoint assembly proteins such as Bub1, BubR1, and Bub3. BubR1 and Bub3 can also form complexes with Cdc20, but it remains to be seen if these proteins facilitate Cdc20 binding to Open Mad2.

It is also unclear how p31comet antagonizes the checkpoint and promotes the dissociation of Mad2-Cdc20. De Antoni et al. in conjunction with the “Mad2 Template” suggest that p31comet competes with Open Mad2 for binding to Closed Mad2:Mad1. Testing is underway in order to illuminate how p31comet may silence the spindle checkpoint.
