= CDH1 =

CDH1 may refer to:

- Huntsville/Deerhurst Resort Airport
- CDH1 (gene), classical cadherin from the cadherin superfamily
- APC/C activator protein CDH1, cell-cycle regulated activator of the anaphase-promoting complex/cyclosome (APC/C)
