= BUB1B =

Protein-coding gene in the species Homo sapiens

Identifiers
- Aliases: BUB1B, BUB1beta, BUBR1, Bub1A, MAD3L, MVA1, SSK1, hBUBR1, BUB1 mitotic checkpoint serine/threonine kinase B
- External IDs: OMIM: 602860; MGI: 1333889; GeneCards: BUB1B
Available structures
PDB	Ortholog search: PDBe RCSB
PDB	List of PDB id codes 2WVI, 3SI5, 4GGD, 5JJA
Enzyme activity
EC #	BRENDA	ExPASy	KEGG	MetaCyc
2.7.11.1	↗	↗	↗	↗

Gene location (Human)
Chr.	Chromosome 15 (human)
Band	15q15.1	Start	40,161,023 bp
Band	15q15.1	End	40,221,123 bp

Gene location (Mouse)
Chr.	Chromosome 2 (mouse)
Band	2|2 E5	Start	118,428,692 bp
Band	2|2 E5	End	118,472,072 bp
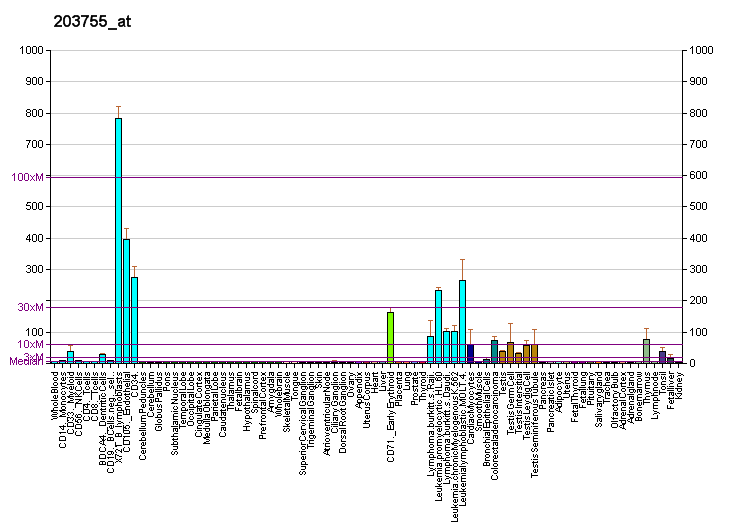
RNA expression pattern
Bgee	Human / Mouse (ortholog); Top expressed in: secondary oocyte; ventricular zone; gonad; embryo; Epithelium of choroid plexus; ganglionic eminence; right testis; bone marrow; left testis; trabecular bone / Top expressed in: secondary oocyte; primary oocyte; ectoderm; otic vesicle; primitive streak; otic placode; tail of embryo; spermatocyte; genital tubercle; zygote; More reference expression data
BioGPS	More reference expression data
Gene ontology
Molecular function	protein serine/threonine kinase activity; ATP binding; protein binding; kinase activity; nucleotide binding; transferase activity; protein kinase activity
Cellular component	kinetochore; nucleus; cytoskeleton; outer kinetochore; microtubule organizing center; perinuclear region of cytoplasm; chromosome, centromeric region; anaphase-promoting complex; chromosome; cytoplasm; spindle midzone; cytosol; spindle
Biological process	protein localization to chromosome, centromeric region; anaphase-promoting complex-dependent catabolic process; mitotic cell cycle checkpoint signaling; protein phosphorylation; metaphase; cell cycle; apoptotic process; phosphorylation; cell division; cell population proliferation; protein localization to kinetochore; mitotic spindle assembly checkpoint signaling; meiotic sister chromatid cohesion, centromeric; mitotic cell cycle; regulation of mitotic cell cycle phase transition; ubiquitin-dependent protein catabolic process
Sources:Amigo / QuickGO
Orthologs
Databases	NCBI: entry; OMA: entry
Species	Human	Mouse
Entrez	701	12236
Ensembl	ENSG00000156970	ENSMUSG00000040084
UniProt	O60566	Q9Z1S0
RefSeq (mRNA)	NM_001211	NM_009773
RefSeq (protein)	NP_001202	NP_033903
Location (UCSC)	Chr 15: 40.16 – 40.22 Mb	Chr 2: 118.43 – 118.47 Mb
PubMed search
- Wikidata
View/Edit Human	View/Edit Mouse

Mitotic checkpoint serine/threonine-protein kinase BUB1 beta is an enzyme that in humans is encoded by the BUB1B gene. Also known as BubR1, this protein is recognized for its mitotic roles in the spindle assembly checkpoint (SAC) and kinetochore-microtubule interactions that facilitate chromosome migration and alignment. BubR1 promotes mitotic fidelity and protects against aneuploidy by ensuring proper chromosome segregation between daughter cells. BubR1 is proposed to prevent tumorigenesis.

== Function ==
This gene encodes a kinase involved in spindle checkpoint function and chromosome segregation. The protein has been localized to the kinetochore and plays a role in the inhibition of the anaphase-promoting complex/cyclosome (APC/C), delaying the onset of anaphase and ensuring proper chromosome segregation. Impaired spindle checkpoint function has been found in many forms of cancer.

Increased expression of BubR1 in mice extends a healthy lifespan.

== Clinical Significance ==
BubR1 has been implicated in a variety of biological processes and pathologies, including cancer, aging, mosaic variegated aneuploidy (MVA), and heart disease. BubR1 protein levels are shown to decline with age. Furthermore, loss of BubR1 in young organisms is associated with rapid aging and premature onset of age-related diseases and phenotypes such as cardiac dysfunction, poor wound healing, cataracts, kyphosis, fat loss and muscle wasting (cachexia), and cancer. This has been demonstrated in mice.

== DNA repair ==
Chemoradiotherapy (CRT), the combination of chemotherapy and radiotherapy applied with curative intent, is used to treat a variety of cancers. CRT acts by inducing damage in the DNA of the cancer cells. Bladder cancer tumor samples were taken from patients before treatment and from the same patients after CRT treatment when the tumors had reoccurred. An increased level of BUB1B expression was found in the CRT-recurrent cells. This increased expression was considered to facilitate an inaccurate DNA repair process termed alternative non-homologous end joining (A-NHEJ) that inaccurately repairs DNA damages such as those caused by the CRT. This inaccurate repair could cause additional mutations in the tumor including mutations to CRT resistance.

== Interactions ==
BUB1B has been shown to interact with:

- AP2B1
- BRCA2
- BUB3
- CDC20
- MAD2L1
- CBP
- SIRT2
- PLK1
- PP2A-B56
- HDAC1
- HDAC2 / HDAC3
- SNCG
