= Nocodazole =

Microtubule depolymerizing drug

Names
- IUPAC name Methyl [5-(2-thienylcarbonyl)-1H-benzimidazol-2-yl]carbamate

Identifiers
CAS Number	31430-18-9
3D model (JSmol)	Interactive image
ChEBI	CHEBI:34892
ChEMBL	ChEMBL9514
ChemSpider	3979
ECHA InfoCard	100.046.008
EC Number	250-626-5
KEGG	C13719
PubChem CID	4122
UNII	SH1WY3R615
CompTox Dashboard (EPA)	DTXSID9031800
- InChI: InChI=1S/C14H11N3O3S/c1-20-14(19)17-13-15-9-5-4-8(7-10(9)16-13)12(18)11-3-2-6-21-11/h2-7H,1H3,(H2,15,16,17,19) Key: KYRVNWMVYQXFEU-UHFFFAOYSA-N; InChI=1/C14H11N3O3S/c1-20-14(19)17-13-15-9-5-4-8(7-10(9)16-13)12(18)11-3-2-6-21-11/h2-7H,1H3,(H2,15,16,17,19) Key: KYRVNWMVYQXFEU-UHFFFAOYAF
- SMILES: O=C(C2=CC=CS2)C1=CC=C(N=C(NC(OC)=O)N3)C3=C1

Properties
Chemical formula	C_{14}H_{11}N_{3}O_{3}S
Molar mass	301.32 g·mol^{−1}
Appearance	White with faint yellow cast powder
Melting point	256 °C (493 °F; 529 K)
Solubility in water	Approximately 10 mg/mL in DMSO
- Except where otherwise noted, data are given for materials in their standard state (at 25 °C [77 °F], 100 kPa). verify (what is ?) Infobox references

Nocodazole is an antineoplastic agent which exerts its effect in cells by interfering with the polymerization of microtubules. Microtubules are one type of fibre which constitutes the cytoskeleton, and the dynamic microtubule network has several important roles in the cell, including vesicular transport, forming the mitotic spindle and in cytokinesis. Several drugs including vincristine and colcemid are similar to nocodazole in that they interfere with microtubule polymerization.

Nocodazole has been shown to decrease the oncogenic potential of cancer cells via another microtubules-independent mechanisms. Nocodazole stimulates the expression of LATS2 which potently inhibits the Wnt signaling pathway by abrogating the interaction between the Wnt-dependent transcriptional co-factors beta-catenin and BCL9.

It is related to mebendazole by replacement of the left most benzene ring by thiophene.

== Use in cell biology research ==
As nocodazole affects the cytoskeleton, it is often used in cell biology experiments as a control: for example, some dominant negative Rho small GTPases cause a similar effect as nocodazole, and constitutively activated mutants often reverse or negate the effect.

Nocodazole is frequently used in cell biology laboratories to synchronize the cell division cycle. Cells treated with nocodazole arrest with a G2- or M-phase DNA content when analyzed by flow cytometry. Microscopy of nocodazole-treated cells shows that they do enter mitosis but cannot form metaphase spindles because microtubules (of which the spindles are made) cannot polymerise. The absence of microtubule attachment to kinetochores activates the spindle assembly checkpoint, causing the cell to arrest in prometaphase. For cell synchronization experiments, nocodazole is usually used at a concentration of 40–100 ng/mL of culture medium for a duration of 12–18 hours. Prolonged arrest of cells in mitosis due to nocodazole treatment typically results in cell death by apoptosis.

Another standard cell biological application of nocodazole is to induce the formation of Golgi ministacks in eukaryotic cells. The perinuclear structural organization of the Golgi apparatus in eukaryotes is dependent on microtubule trafficking, but disrupting the trafficking of Golgi elements from the endoplasmic reticulum treatment with nocodazole (33 μM for 3 hours) induces numerous Golgi elements to form adjacent to ER exit sites. These functional Golgi ministacks remain distributed about the cell, unable to track forward to form a perinuclear Golgi since nocodazole has depolymerized the microtubules.

Also used with Mad2p protein as an anti-microtubule drug.

== See also ==
- Colchicine
