= MAD2L1 =

Protein-coding gene in the species Homo sapiens

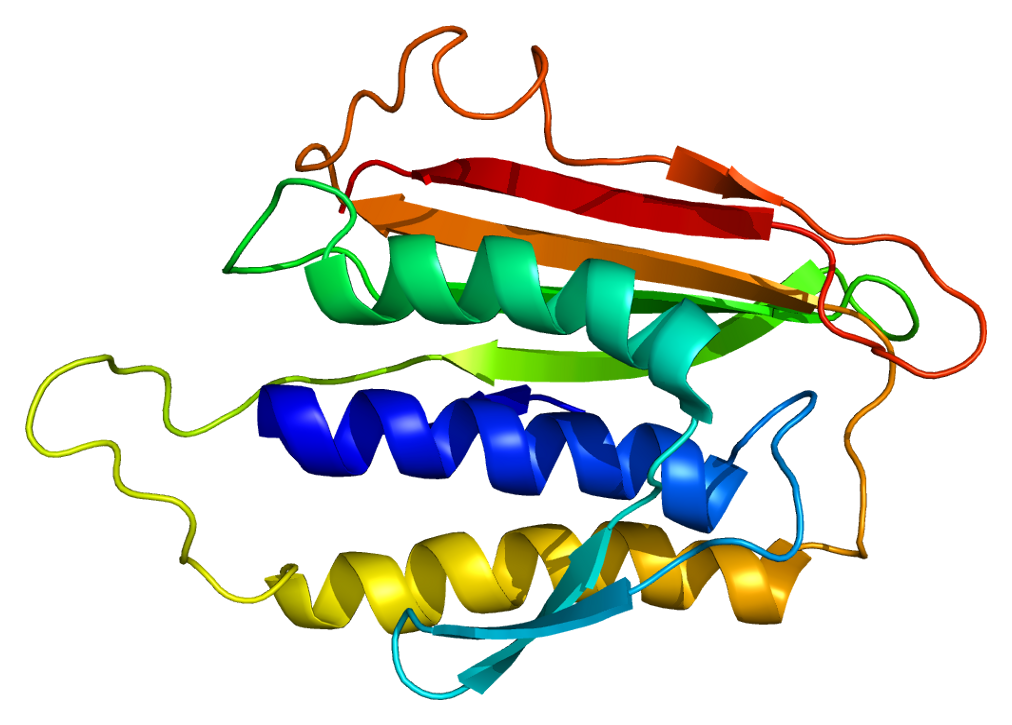
Available structures
PDB	Ortholog search: PDBe RCSB
PDB	List of PDB id codes 1DUJ, 1GO4, 1KLQ, 1S2H, 2QYF, 2V64, 2VFX, 3GMH

Identifiers
- Aliases: MAD2L1, HSMAD2, MAD2, MAD2 mitotic arrest deficient-like 1 (yeast), mitotic arrest deficient 2 like 1
- External IDs: OMIM: 601467; MGI: 1860374; HomoloGene: 1768; GeneCards: MAD2L1; OMA:MAD2L1 - orthologs

Gene location (Human)
Chr.	Chromosome 4 (human)
Band	4q27	Start	120,055,623 bp
Band	4q27	End	120,066,858 bp

Gene location (Mouse)
Chr.	Chromosome 6 (mouse)
Band	6 C1|6 30.56 cM	Start	66,512,374 bp
Band	6 C1|6 30.56 cM	End	66,524,204 bp
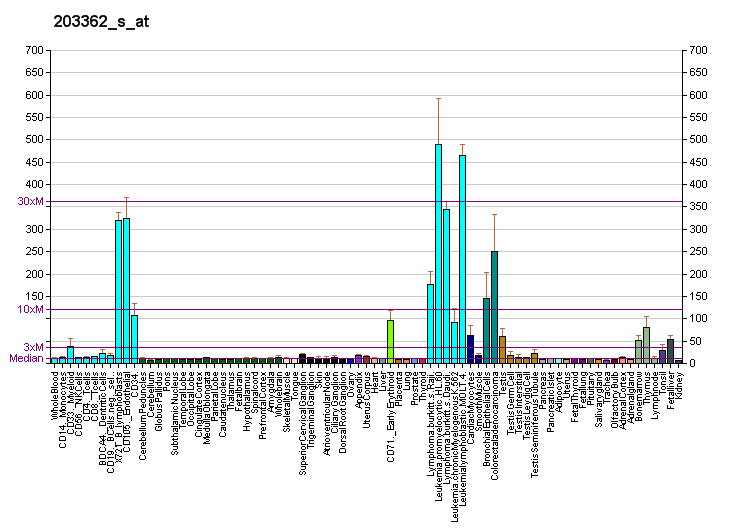
RNA expression pattern
Bgee	Human / Mouse (ortholog); Top expressed in: secondary oocyte; ventricular zone; embryo; ganglionic eminence; gonad; epithelium of nasopharynx; bone marrow; mucosa of transverse colon; amniotic fluid; rectum / Top expressed in: zygote; secondary oocyte; primitive streak; tail of embryo; medial ganglionic eminence; abdominal wall; genital tubercle; primary oocyte; fetal liver hematopoietic progenitor cell; epiblast; More reference expression data
BioGPS	More reference expression data
Gene ontology
Molecular function	protein homodimerization activity; protein binding; identical protein binding; protein C-terminus binding
Cellular component	cytoplasm; cytosol; spindle pole; nuclear pore; chromosome; perinuclear region of cytoplasm; mitotic spindle; chromosome, centromeric region; cytoskeleton; nucleus; kinetochore; nucleoplasm; nuclear pore nuclear basket
Biological process	positive regulation of mitotic cell cycle spindle assembly checkpoint; negative regulation of protein catabolic process; mitotic cell cycle checkpoint signaling; negative regulation of apoptotic process; cell division; mitotic sister chromatid segregation; cell cycle; anaphase-promoting complex-dependent catabolic process; negative regulation of mitotic cell cycle; mitotic spindle assembly checkpoint signaling; negative regulation of ubiquitin protein ligase activity; regulation of mitotic cell cycle phase transition; ubiquitin-dependent protein catabolic process; establishment of mitotic spindle orientation; establishment of centrosome localization
Sources:Amigo / QuickGO
Orthologs
Species	Human	Mouse
Entrez	4085	56150
Ensembl	ENSG00000164109	ENSMUSG00000029910
UniProt	Q13257	Q9Z1B5
RefSeq (mRNA)	NM_002358	NM_019499; NM_001355624
RefSeq (protein)	NP_002349	NP_062372; NP_001342553
Location (UCSC)	Chr 4: 120.06 – 120.07 Mb	Chr 6: 66.51 – 66.52 Mb
PubMed search
- Wikidata
View/Edit Human	View/Edit Mouse

Mitotic spindle assembly checkpoint protein MAD2A is a protein that in humans is encoded by the MAD2L1 gene.

== Function ==
MAD2L1 is a component of the mitotic spindle assembly checkpoint that prevents the onset of anaphase until all chromosomes are properly aligned at the metaphase plate. MAD2L1 is related to the MAD2L2 gene located on chromosome 1. A MAD2 pseudogene has been mapped to chromosome 14.

== Interactions ==
MAD2L1 has been shown to interact with:

- ADAM17,
- BUB1B,
- CDC20,
- CDC27 and
- Estrogen receptor beta,
- MAD2L2,
- Mad1, and
- UBD.
