= APC/C activator protein CDH1 =

Fungal protein found in Saccharomyces cerevisiae S288c

SCF(Fbw7) ubiquitin ligase complex
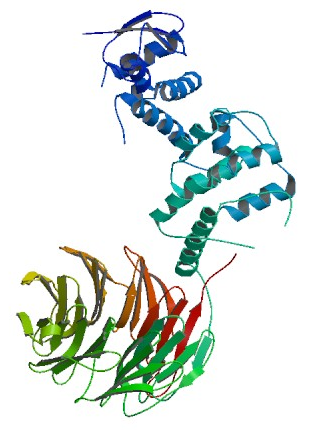

Identifiers
- Symbol: Cdh1, Hct1
- PDB: 2ovq
- UniProt: P53197
Search for
- Structures: Swiss-model
- Domains: InterPro

Cdh1 (cdc20 homolog 1) is one of the substrate adaptor proteins of the anaphase-promoting complex (APC) in the budding yeast Saccharomyces cerevisiae. Functioning as an activator of the APC/C, Cdh1 regulates the activity and substrate specificity of this ubiquitin E3-ligase. The human homolog is encoded by the FZR1 gene, which is not to be confused with the CDH1 gene.

== Introduction ==
Cdh1 plays a pivotal role in controlling cell division at the end of mitosis (telophase) and in the subsequent G1 phase of cell cycle: By recognizing and binding proteins (like mitotic cyclins) which contain a destruction box (D-box) and an additional degradation signal (KEN box), Cdh1 recruits them in a C-box-dependent mechanism to the APC for ubiquination and subsequent proteolysis. Cdh1 is required for the exit of mitosis. Furthermore, it is thought to be a possible target of a BUB2-dependent spindle checkpoint pathway.

== Function ==
The anaphase-promoting complex/cyclosome (APC/c) is an ubiquitin E3-ligase complex. Once activated it attaches chains of ubiquitin molecules to its target substrates. These chains are recognised and the substrate is degraded by the Proteasome. Cdh1 is one of the co- activator proteins of APC/c and therefore contributes to the regulation of protein degradation, by providing substrate specificity to the E3-ligase in a cell cycle regulated manner.

Cdh1 can exist in several forms. It can be phosphorylated by CDKs, which inactivates it and it can be dephosphorylated by Cdc14. In the dephosphorylated form it can interact with APC/c and build the active ligase APC^{Cdh1}.

Suppression of Cdh1 by RNA interference leads to an aberrant accumulation of APC^{Cdh1} target proteins, such as cyclin A and B, the kinase AuroraB, PLK1, Skp2 and Cdc20, another APC/c co- activator.

=== Stabilising G_{1}-phase ===
The main function of Cdh1 is to suppress the re-accumulation of mitotic cyclins and other cell cycle determinants and therefore stabilising the G_{1}-phase. It is inactive in early stages of mitosis and only becomes active in the transition from late mitosis to G_{1}.

During the cell cycle Cdk gets activated through cyclins, this leads to the mitotic entry and promotes APC^{Cdc20} activation. APC^{Cdc20} degrades the cyclins, this and the activation of Cdc14 leads to the creation of APC^{Cdh1}. APC^{Cdh1} keeps the cyclin concentration low and the Cdk inactive that maintains the G1-Phase.

=== G_{1}/S transition ===
APC^{Cdh1} is thought to prevent premature S-phase entry by degrading mitotic cyclins in G1 and regulate processes unrelated to the cell cycle. To enter S-phase APC^{Cdh1} must be inactivated. This is made through degradation of the complex and through phosphorylation of Cdh1.

=== Exit from mitosis ===
One characteristic of budding yeast cells exit from mitosis after chromosome segregation is the removal of the mitotic determinants. This requires the inactivation of mitotic CDKs which are inactivated through ubiquitin-dependent pathways. The protein phosphatase Cdc14 dephosphorylates Cdh1 and therefore activates APC^{Cdh1}. As a result the concentration of many APC^{Cdh1} substrates (e.g. M-Cyclins) drops down at the cell exit from mitosis.

=== Cdh1 functions as a tumour suppressor ===
Cdh1-deficient cells can proliferate but accumulate mitotic errors and have difficulties with cytokinesis.

It has been shown that APC^{Cdh1}-mediated degradation of PIk1 plays an important role in preventing mitosis in cells that have DNA-damage. In healthy cells Cdh1 stays inactive from late G1 to early mitosis. It stays inactive in early mitosis and only becomes active in the transition from late mitosis to G1. A cell that suffers from DNA-damage shows an active Cdh1 already in late G1 and therefore blocks the mitotic entry.

One substrate of APC^{Cdh1} is the transcription factor Ets2, which is activated by the Ras-Raf-MAPK signalling pathway and induces the expression of cyclin D1. This pathway stimulates cell proliferation. It was shown that an increased expression of Ets2 can be associated with various cancer types, in the likes of cervical cancer or oesophageal squamous cell carcinoma.

=== Function of Cdh1 in non-dividing cells ===
It was shown that APC^{Cdh1} is active in adult brain and liver tissues. It seems that the complex has a function in axon growth, morphology and plasticity of synapses as well as in learning and memory.

== Structure ==
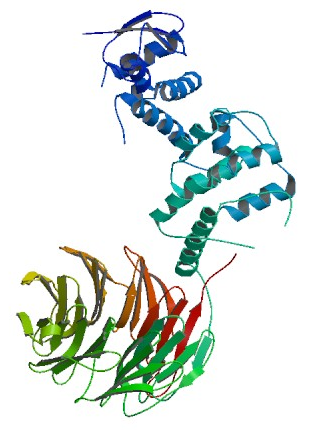
Fig. 1 There is no structure resolved for Cdh1 of Saccharomyces cerevisiae. There is a model based on template pdb2ovq, which shows the SCF(Fbw7) ubiquitin ligase complex. Fbw7 is also a WD repeat protein like Cdh1. (The model for Cdh1 can be found on the webpage of SWISS-MODEL Repository, see the external link at the end of this page)

The following structural informations are based on the cdh1 protein of Saccharomyces cerevisiae also named Hct1. Cdh1 is a cdc20 homolog and is Frizzy-related (Drosophila). The protein sequence of cdh1 consists of 566 amino acids and has a molecular weight of 62.8 kDa. Cdh1 comprises different domains important for its proper function, when it interacts with the APC/c complex and the various substrates.

=== Activation and APC/c binding ===
In the N-terminal region at amino acid position 55-61 the cdh1 protein contains a C-Box motif, which is required for the association with the APC/c complex. Especially the residue R56 seems to be important for the binding to APC/c in vitro and Cdh1 function in vivo.

Cdh1 contains multiple phosphorylation sites for the kinase cdc28. When cdh1 is hyperphosphorytaled, the association of cdh1 to the APC/c is blocked, thus leading to the inactive form of cdh1. Activation can be induced by dephosphorylation through the phosphatase cdc14, which leads to the binding of cdh1 to the APC/c.

Cdh1 as well includes a poly-Ser in the N-terminal region from residue 32-38. In general serine, threonine and tyrosine side chains can act as phosphorylation sites for posttranslational modification. In the cdh1 protein amino acid modifications can be found at residue 156 being a phosphoserine and at residue 157 being a phosphothreonine.

Cdh1 also contains a C-terminal Ile-Arg (IR) dipeptide motif at residue 565 and 566, which is suggested to bind to the Cdc27 subunit of APC.

=== Substrate binding ===
Cdh1 has seven WD repeats, which are located between the middle of the protein and the C-terminal end. They have a conserved core length of about 38 to 43 amino acids, which in general end with tryptophan-aspartic acid (WD). WD repeat proteins are assumed to form a circularized beta propeller structure, which is thought to be essential for the biological function. The WD repeats in cdh1 are suspected to be the binding sites for the APC/c substrates. Thus cdh1 seems to be a sort of linker between the APC/c complex and the substrates. The APC/c substrates contain a D-Box and/or a KEN-Box, which are important for the interaction with cdh1.

== See also ==
- APC/c
- Cdc20
