= Prometaphase =

Second stage of mitosis and meiosis

Diagram of prometaphase

Prometaphase is the stage of mitosis following prophase and preceding metaphase in eukaryotic somatic cells. In prometaphase, the nuclear membrane breaks apart into numerous "membrane vesicles," and the chromosomes inside form protein structures called kinetochores. Kinetochore microtubules emerging from the centrosomes at the poles (ends) of the spindle reach the chromosomes and attach to the kinetochores, throwing the chromosomes into agitated motion. Other spindle microtubules make contact with microtubules coming from the opposite pole. Forces exerted by protein "motors" associated with spindle microtubules move the chromosomes toward the centre of the cell.

Prometaphase is not always presented as a distinct part of mitosis. In sources that do not use the term, the events described here are instead assigned to late prophase and early metaphase.

== Types of microtubules ==
The microtubules are composed of two types, kinetochore microtubules and non-kinetochore microtubules.

- Kinetochore microtubules begin searching for kinetochores to attach to.
- A number of non-kinetochore microtubules or polar microtubules find and interact with corresponding nonkinetochore microtubules from the opposite centrosome to form the mitotic spindle.

== Transition from prometaphase to metaphase ==
The role of prometaphase is completed when all of the kinetochore microtubules have attached to their kinetochores, upon which metaphase begins. An unattached kinetochore, and thus a non-aligned chromosome, even when most of the other chromosomes have lined up, will trigger the spindle checkpoint signal. This prevents premature progression into anaphase by inhibiting the anaphase-promoting complex until all kinetochores are attached and all the chromosomes aligned.

Early events of metaphase can coincide with the later events of prometaphase, as chromosomes with connected kinetochores will start the events of metaphase individually before other chromosomes with unconnected kinetochores that are still lingering in the events of prometaphase.
