= CDC20 =

Protein-coding gene in humans

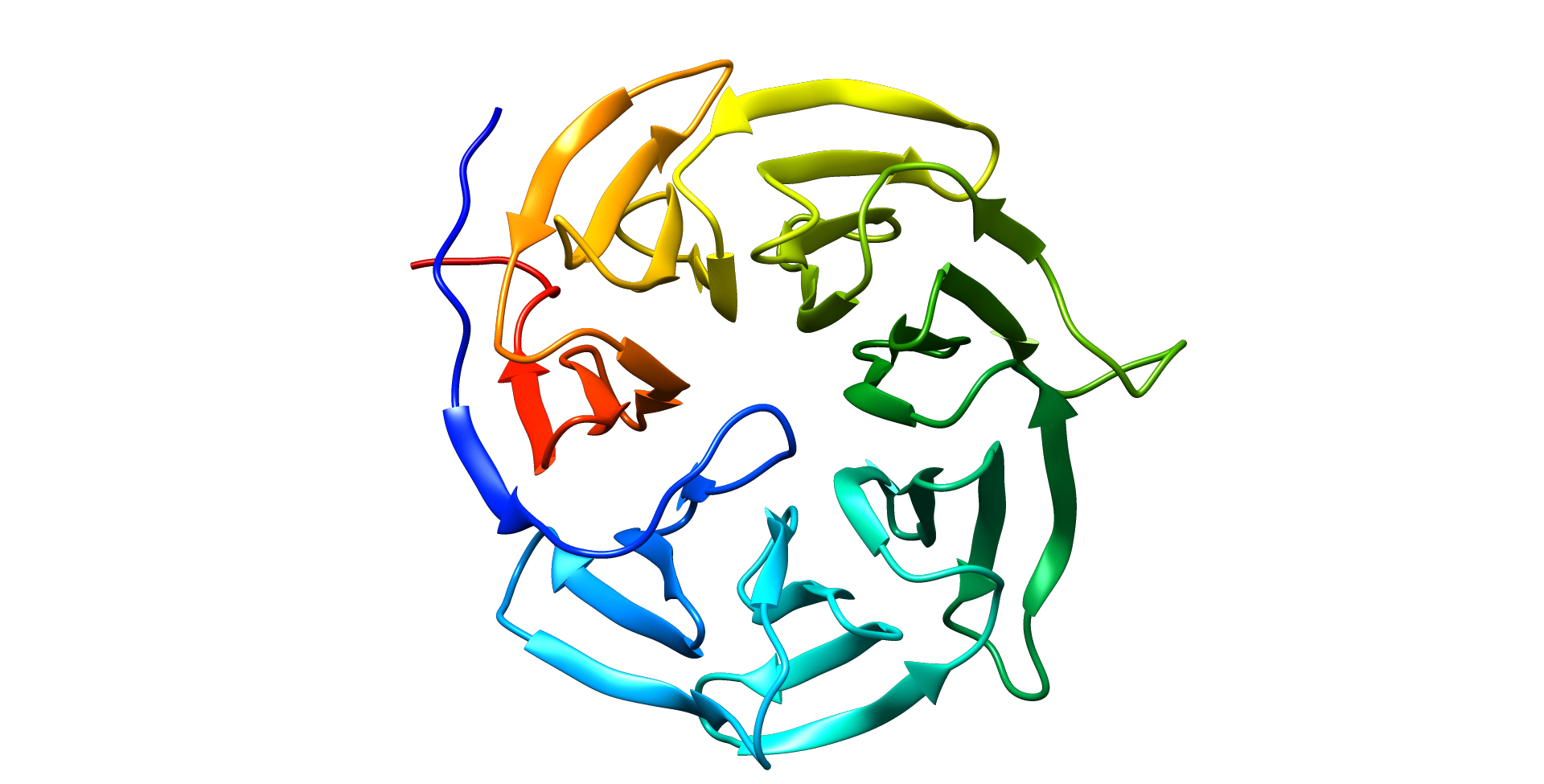

Identifiers
- Aliases: CDC20, CDC20A, bA276H19.3, p55CDC, cell division cycle 20
- External IDs: OMIM: 603618; MGI: 1859866; GeneCards: CDC20
Available structures
PDB	Ortholog search: PDBe RCSB
PDB	List of PDB id codes 4GGA, 4GGC, 4GGD, 4N14, 5G04

Gene location (Human)
Chr.	Chromosome 1 (human)
Band	1p34.2	Start	43,358,981 bp
Band	1p34.2	End	43,363,203 bp

Gene location (Mouse)
Chr.	Chromosome 4 (mouse)
Band	4|4 D2.1	Start	118,290,098 bp
Band	4|4 D2.1	End	118,294,549 bp
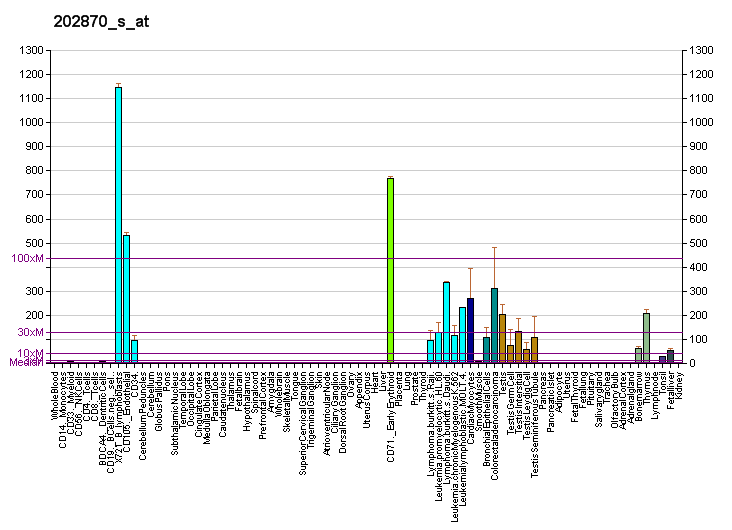
RNA expression pattern
Bgee	Human / Mouse (ortholog); Top expressed in: oocyte; ventricular zone; secondary oocyte; embryo; ganglionic eminence; left testis; right testis; mucosa of transverse colon; gonad; trabecular bone / Top expressed in: medial ganglionic eminence; primitive streak; abdominal wall; ureter; endocardial cushion; internal carotid artery; epiblast; renal corpuscle; external carotid artery; hair follicle; More reference expression data
BioGPS	More reference expression data
Gene ontology
Molecular function	protein C-terminus binding; protein binding; anaphase-promoting complex binding; ubiquitin-protein transferase activator activity; enzyme binding; histone deacetylase binding
Cellular component	centrosome; spindle pole; spindle; microtubule organizing center; perinuclear region of cytoplasm; anaphase-promoting complex; cytoskeleton; cytoplasm; nucleus; nucleoplasm; cytosol; protein-containing complex
Biological process	cell differentiation; regulation of meiotic nuclear division; regulation of dendrite development; nervous system development; positive regulation of synaptic plasticity; cell division; positive regulation of synapse maturation; protein ubiquitination; positive regulation of cell population proliferation; anaphase-promoting complex-dependent catabolic process; positive regulation of ubiquitin protein ligase activity; mitotic sister chromatid cohesion; protein deubiquitination; mitotic spindle assembly; cell cycle; mitotic spindle assembly checkpoint signaling; regulation of mitotic cell cycle phase transition; ubiquitin-dependent protein catabolic process
Sources:Amigo / QuickGO
Orthologs
Databases	NCBI: entry; OMA: entry
Species	Human	Mouse
Entrez	991	107995
Ensembl	ENSG00000117399	ENSMUSG00000006398
UniProt	Q12834	Q9JJ66
RefSeq (mRNA)	NM_001255	NM_023223
RefSeq (protein)	NP_001246	NP_075712
Location (UCSC)	Chr 1: 43.36 – 43.36 Mb	Chr 4: 118.29 – 118.29 Mb
PubMed search
- Wikidata
View/Edit Human	View/Edit Mouse

The cell division cycle protein 20 homolog is an essential regulator of cell division that is encoded by the CDC20 gene in humans. To the best of current knowledge its most important function is to activate the anaphase promoting complex (APC/C), a large 11-13 subunit complex that initiates chromatid separation and entrance into anaphase. The APC/C^{Cdc20} protein complex has two main downstream targets. Firstly, it targets securin for destruction, enabling the eventual destruction of cohesin and thus sister chromatid separation. It also targets S and M-phase (S/M) cyclins for destruction, which inactivates S/M cyclin-dependent kinases (Cdks) and allows the cell to exit from mitosis. A closely related protein, Cdc20homologue-1 (Cdh1) plays a complementary role in the cell cycle.

CDC20 appears to act as a regulatory protein interacting with many other proteins at multiple points in the cell cycle. It is required for two microtubule-dependent processes: nuclear movement prior to anaphase, and chromosome separation.

== Discovery ==
CDC20, along with a handful of other Cdc proteins, was discovered in the early 1970s when Hartwell and colleagues made cell-division cycle mutants that failed to complete major events in the cell cycle in the yeast strain S. cerevisiae. Hartwell found mutants that did not enter anaphase and thus could not complete mitosis; this phenotype could be traced back to the CDC20 gene. However, even after the biochemistry of the protein was eventually elucidated, the molecular role of CDC20 remained elusive until the discovery of the APC/C in 1995.

== Structure ==
CDC20 is a protein related to the beta subunit of heterotrimeric G proteins. Near its C-terminus it contains seven WD40 repeats, which are multiple short, structural motifs of around 40 amino acids that often play a role in binding with larger protein complexes. In the case of CDC20, they arrange into a seven-bladed beta propeller. The human CDC20 is about 499 amino acids long, and contains at least four phosphorylation sites near the N-terminus. In between these phosphorylation sites, which play regulatory roles, are the C-box, the KEN-box, the Mad2-interacting motif, and the Cry box. The KEN-box, as well as the Cry box, are important recognition and degradation sequences for the APC/C^{Cdh1} complex (see below).

== Interactions ==
CDC20 has been shown to interact with:

- ANAPC7
- BUB1B,
- CDC16,
- CDC27,
- Cyclin A1,
- FBXO5,
- HDAC1,
- HDAC2, and
- MAD2L1.

However, the most important interaction of CDC20 is with the Anaphase Promoting Complex. The APC/C is a large E3 ubiquitin ligase, which triggers the metaphase to anaphase transition by marking select proteins for degradation. The two main targets of the APC/C are the S/M cyclins and the protein securin. S/M cyclins activate cyclin-dependent kinases (Cdks), which have a vast array of downstream effects that work to guide the cell through mitosis. They must be degraded for cells to exit mitosis. Securin is a protein that inhibits separase, which in turn inhibits cohesin, a protein that holds sister chromatids together. Therefore, in order for anaphase to progress, securin must be inhibited so that cohesin can be cleaved by separase. These processes are dependent on both the APC/C and CDC20: When Cdks phosphorylate the APC/C, CDC20 can bind and activate it, allowing both the degradation of Cdks and the cleavage of cohesin. APC/C activity is dependent on CDC20 (and Cdh1), because CDC20 often binds the APC/C substrates directly. In fact, it is thought that CDC20 and Cdh1 (see below) are receptors for the KEN-box and D-box motifs on substrates. However, these sequences are normally not sufficient for ubiquitination and degradation; much remains to be learned about how CDC20 binds its substrate.

== Regulation ==
The APC/C^{Cdc20} complex regulates itself so that it is present during the appropriate times of the cell cycle. In order for CDC20 to bind the APC/C, specific APC/C subunits must be phosphorylated by Cdk1 (among other Cdks). Therefore, when cdk activity is high in mitosis, and the cell must prepare to enter anaphase and exit mitosis, the APC/C^{Cdc20} complex is activated. Once active, APC/C^{Cdc20} promotes the degradation of Cdks by inactivating S/M cyclins. Cdk degradation brings about lower rates of APC/C phosphorylation and thus lower rates of CDC20 binding. In this way, the APC/C^{Cdc20} complex inactivates itself by the end of mitosis. However, because the cell does not immediately enter the cell cycle, Cdks can not immediately be reactivated. Multiple different mechanisms inhibit Cdks in G1: Cdk inhibitor proteins are expressed, and cyclin gene expression is down-regulated. Importantly, cyclin accumulation is also prevented by Cdh1.

== Cdh1 ==
CDC20-homologue 1 (Cdh1) plays a complementary role to CDC20 in cell cycle progression. During the time of APC/C^{Cdc20} activity, Cdh1 is phosphorylated and cannot bind to the APC/C. After metaphase, however, S/M-Cdks are inactivated by APC/C^{Cdc20}, and Cdh1 can exist in a non-phosphorylated state and bind the APC/C. This enables the APC/C to continue to degrade S/M cyclins (and thus S/M Cdks) until they are needed again in the next S-phase. How can S/M cyclins reappear to shepherd the cell into mitosis? The APC/C^{Cdc20} does not recognize G1/S cyclins. Their concentration rises during G1, activating G1/S Cdks, which in turn phosphorylate Cdh1 and gradually relieve the inhibition on S/M cyclins.

== Spindle assembly checkpoint ==
CDC20 is also a part of, and regulated by, the spindle assembly checkpoint (SAC). This checkpoint ensures that anaphase proceeds only when the centromeres of all sister chromatids lined up on the metaphase plate are properly attached to microtubules. The checkpoint is held active by any unattached centromere; only when all centromeres are attached will anaphase commence. The APC/C^{Cdc20} is an important target of the SAC, which consists of several different proteins, including Mad2, Mad3(BubR1), and Bub3. In fact, these three proteins, together with CDC20, likely form the mitotic checkpoint complex (MCC), which inhibits APC/C^{Cdc20} so that anaphase cannot begin prematurely. Moreover, Bub1 phosphorylates and thus inhibits CDC20 directly, while in yeast Mad2 and Mad3, when bound to CDC20, trigger its autoubiquitination.

== Cancer ==
CDC20 is often elevated in cancerous tissues for multiple kinds of cancer. It is correlated with aggressiveness in breast cancer: higher levels are associated with poorer outcomes. CDC20 overexpression has also been reported in lung, gastric, and pancreatic cancers. For gastric and pancreatic cancers, higher levels are correlated with tumor size, histological grade (the abnormality of the cells), and metastases to the lymph nodes. In colorectal cancer and non-small-cell lung carcinoma, it is associated with cancer stage, and thus has been proposed as a biomarker to help predict the prognosis for people with either cancer.
