= Anaphase =

Fourth stage of mitosis and meiosis

Diagram of anaphase

Anaphase (from Ancient Greek ἀνα- (ana-) 'back, backward' and φάσις (phásis) 'appearance') is the stage of mitosis after the process of metaphase, when replicated chromosomes are split and the newly-copied chromosomes (daughter chromatids) are moved to opposite poles of the cell. Chromosomes also reach their overall maximum condensation in late anaphase, to help chromosome segregation and the re-formation of the nucleus.

Anaphase starts when the anaphase promoting complex marks an inhibitory chaperone called securin for destruction by ubiquitylating it. Securin is a protein which inhibits a protease known as separase. The destruction of securin unleashes separase which then breaks down cohesin, a protein responsible for holding sister chromatids together.

At this point, three subclasses of microtubule unique to mitosis are involved in creating the forces necessary to separate the chromatids: kinetochore microtubules, interpolar microtubules, and astral microtubules.

The centromeres are split, and the sister chromatids are pulled toward the poles by kinetochore microtubules. They take on a V-shape or Y-shape as they are pulled to either pole.

While the chromosomes are drawn to each side of the cell, interpolar microtubules and astral microtubules generate forces that stretch the cell into an oval.

Once anaphase is complete, the cell moves into telophase.

== Phases ==
Anaphase is characterized by two distinct motions. The first of these, anaphase A, moves chromosomes to either pole of a dividing cell (marked by centrosomes, from which mitotic microtubules are generated and organised). The movement for this is primarily generated by the action of kinetochores, and a subclass of microtubule called kinetochore microtubules.

The second motion, anaphase B, involves the separation of these poles from each other. The movement for this is primarily generated by the action of interpolar microtubules and astral microtubules.

=== Anaphase A ===
A combination of different forces have been observed acting on chromatids in anaphase A, but the primary force is exerted centrally. Microtubules attach to the midpoint of chromosomes (the centromere) via protein complexes (kinetochores). The attached microtubules depolymerise and shorten, which together with motor proteins creates movement that pulls chromosomes towards centrosomes located at each pole of the cell.

=== Anaphase B ===
The second part of anaphase is driven by its own distinct mechanisms. Force is generated by several actions. Interpolar microtubules begin at each centrosome and join at the equator of the dividing cell. They push against one another, causing each centrosome to move further apart. Meanwhile, astral microtubules begin at each centrosome and join with the cell membrane. This allows them to pull each centrosome closer to the cell membrane. Movement created by these microtubules is generated by a combination of microtubule growth or shrinking, and by motor proteins such as dyneins or kinesins.

== Relation to the cell cycle ==
Anaphase accounts for approximately 1% of the cell cycle's duration. It begins with the regulated triggering of the metaphase-to-anaphase transition. Metaphase ends with the destruction of B cyclin. B cyclin is marked with ubiquitin which flags it for destruction by proteasomes, which is required for the function of metaphase cyclin-dependent kinases (M-Cdks). In essence, Activation of the Anaphase-promoting complex (APC) causes the APC to cleave the M-phase cyclin and the inhibitory protein securin which activates the separase protease to cleave the cohesin subunits holding the chromatids together.

== See also ==
- Interphase
- Prophase
- Prometaphase
- Metaphase
- Telophase
- Cytoskeleton
- Anaphase I
- Anaphase II
- Cdc20
