= VDAC1 =

Protein-coding gene in the species Homo sapiens

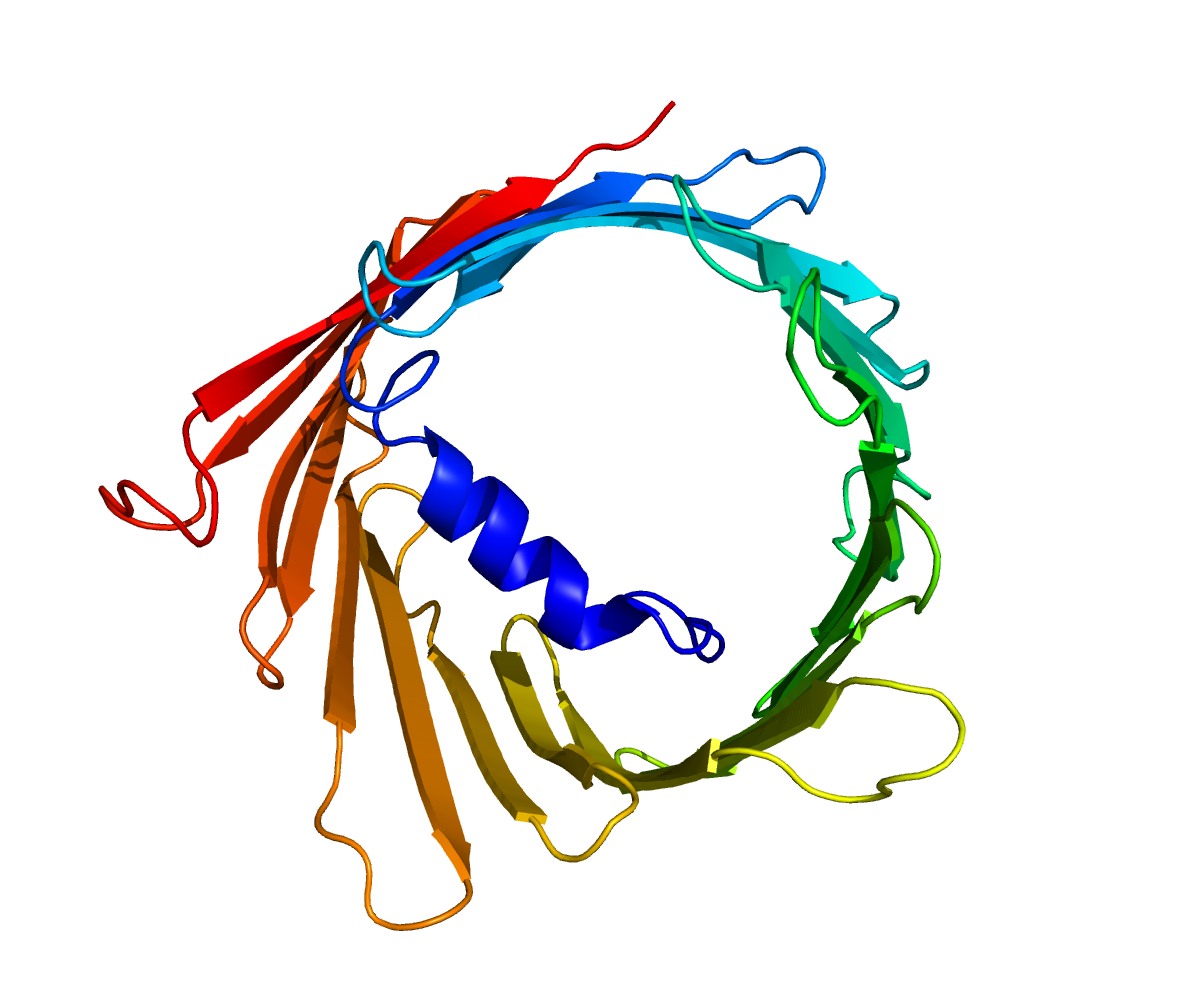

Identifiers
- Aliases: VDAC1, PORIN, VDAC-1, voltage dependent anion channel 1
- External IDs: OMIM: 604492; MGI: 106919; GeneCards: VDAC1
Available structures
PDB	Ortholog search: PDBe RCSB
PDB	List of PDB id codes 2JK4, 2K4T

Gene location (Mouse)
Chr.	Chromosome 11 (mouse)
Band	11 B1.3|11 31.86 cM	Start	52,360,860 bp
Band	11 B1.3|11 31.86 cM	End	52,389,397 bp
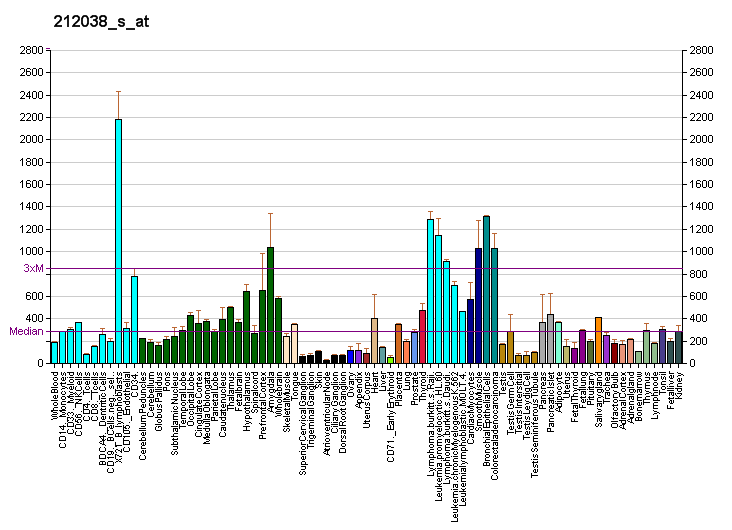

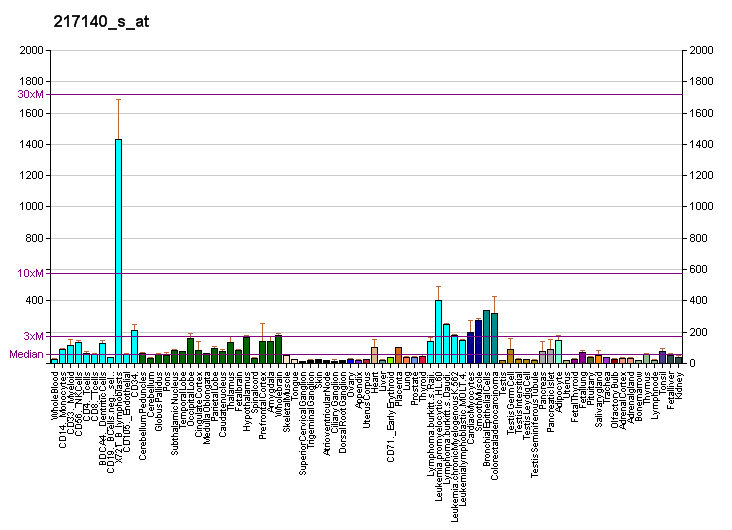
RNA expression pattern
Bgee	Human / Mouse (ortholog); Top expressed in: biceps brachii; Skeletal muscle tissue of biceps brachii; gastrocnemius muscle; muscle of thigh; Skeletal muscle tissue of rectus abdominis; jejunal mucosa; vastus lateralis muscle; right ventricle; left ventricle; glutes / Top expressed in: aortic valve; ascending aorta; renal corpuscle; ankle; temporal muscle; thoracic diaphragm; condyle; sternocleidomastoid muscle; muscle of thigh; pineal gland; More reference expression data
BioGPS	More reference expression data
Gene ontology
Molecular function	porin activity; transmembrane transporter binding; protein-containing complex binding; anion channel activity; voltage-gated anion channel activity; protein binding; protein kinase binding; identical protein binding
Cellular component	integral component of membrane; membrane; synaptic vesicle; myelin sheath; plasma membrane; mitochondrial outer membrane; mitochondrion; mitochondrial inner membrane; membrane raft; mitochondrial nucleoid; extracellular exosome; pore complex; nucleus; mitochondrial permeability transition pore complex; protein-containing complex
Biological process	chemical synaptic transmission; epithelial cell differentiation; mitochondrial calcium ion transmembrane transport; neuron-neuron synaptic transmission; ion transport; learning; anion transport; behavioral fear response; anion transmembrane transport; regulation of autophagy of mitochondrion; transmembrane transport; negative regulation of reactive oxygen species metabolic process; viral process; macroautophagy; apoptotic process; regulation of anion transmembrane transport; transport; pyruvate metabolic process; inorganic anion transport
Sources:Amigo / QuickGO
Orthologs
Databases	NCBI: entry; OMA: entry
Species	Human	Mouse
Entrez	7416	22333
Ensembl	ENSG00000213585	ENSMUSG00000020402
UniProt	P21796	Q60932
RefSeq (mRNA)	NM_003374	NM_011694; NM_001362693
RefSeq (protein)	NP_003365	NP_035824; NP_001349622; NP_001387915; NP_001387916; NP_001387917 NP_001387918
Location (UCSC)	n/a	Chr 11: 52.36 – 52.39 Mb
PubMed search
- Wikidata
View/Edit Human	View/Edit Mouse

Voltage-dependent anion-selective channel 1 (VDAC-1) is a beta barrel protein that in humans is encoded by the VDAC1 gene located on chromosome 5. It forms an ion channel in the outer mitochondrial membrane (OMM) and also the outer cell membrane. In the OMM, it allows ATP to diffuse out of the mitochondria into the cytoplasm. In the cell membrane, it is involved in volume regulation. Within all eukaryotic cells, mitochondria are responsible for synthesis of ATP among other metabolite needed for cell survival. VDAC1 therefore allows for communication between the mitochondrion and the cell mediating the balance between cell metabolism and cell death. Besides metabolic permeation, VDAC1 also acts as a scaffold for proteins such as hexokinase that can in turn regulate metabolism.

This protein is a voltage-dependent anion channel and shares high structural homology with the other VDAC isoforms (VDAC2 and VDAC3), which are involved in the regulation of cell metabolism, mitochondrial apoptosis, and spermatogenesis. Over expression and misregulation of this pore could lead to apoptosis in the cell leading to a variety of diseases within the body. In particular, since VDAC1 is the major calcium ion transport channel, its dysfunction is implicated in cancer, Parkinson's (PD), and Alzheimer's disease. In addition, recent studies have shown that an over expression within the VDAC1 protein is linked to Type 2 Diabetes. Lund University released a study that demonstrated the effects of blocking VDAC1 over expression can prevent the spread of Type 2 Diabetes.

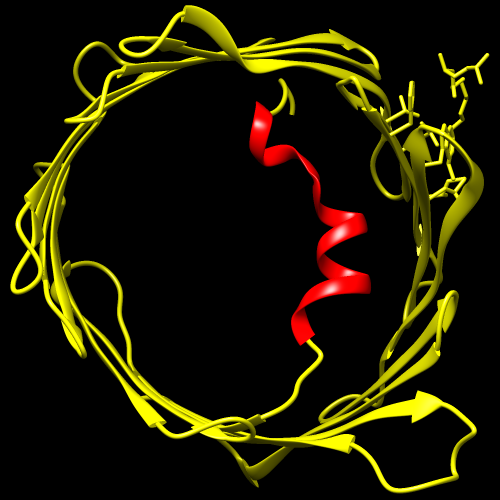
mVDAC1 top down view with alpha helix in the center of the pore.

== Structure ==
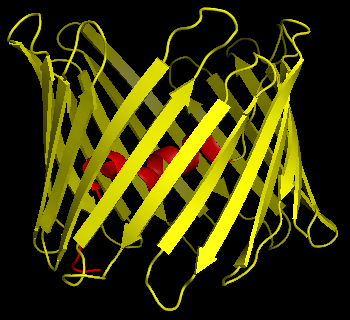
mVDAC1 side view showing antiparallel beta strands

The three VDAC isoforms (VDAC1, VDAC2, and VDAC3) have highly conserved DNA sequences as well as 3D structures forming a wide β-barrel structure, inside of which the alpha helical N-terminal segment resides to partially close the pore. VDAC1's structure was solved by 3 independent labs by x-ray crystallography, Nuclear Magnetic Resonance (NMR) spectroscopy, or a combination of both. Two of these structural studies were used to determine human VDAC1 (hVDAC1) structure while X-ray crystallography was used to solve murine VDAC1 (mVDAC1) structure that differs from hVDAC1 by only two residues. These determined structures aligned with earlier circular dichroism studies that predicted the presence of alpha helix and β-strand domains.

Structural analysis of mVDAC1's structure showed a barrel-like channel composed of 19 amphipathic β-strands, with the N-terminus and C-terminus both facing towards the inter membrane space of the mitochondrion. β-strands are connected via loops and are arranged in an anti-parallel pattern with the exception of β-strands 1 and 19 which are parallel. The pore has a height of 40 Ẳ, spans a distance of 27 Ẳ by 20 Ẳ at the openings and tapers down to 20 Ẳ by 14 Ẳ at the N-terminal α-helix segment in the open state. The closed state conformation has yet to be isolated and determined. Additionally, the N-terminus has an alpha helical segment that is held to the inside wall of the pore by hydrophobic interactions with residues on β-sheets 8-18. This N-terminus can serve as a scaffold for the movement of ions or attachment of proteins. One such example is seen as it is the docking site for HK1 binding. A significant residue to point out is the glutamate located at the 73rd residue on the amino acid chain (E73). This residue is found in VDAC1 and VDAC2 but not VDAC3. The side chain of this charged residue points into the phospholipid bilayer which would normally cause repulsive forces to occur. E73 however, has been implicated in VDAC1 function and interaction.

== Function ==
VDAC1 belongs to the mitochondrial porin family and is expected to share similar biological functions to the other VDAC isoforms. Of the three isoforms, VDAC1 is the main calcium ion transport channel in mitochondria and the most abundantly transcribed. VDAC1 is involved in cell metabolism by transporting ATP and other small metabolites across the outer mitochondrial membrane (OMM) allowing regulation of the TCA cycle and, by extension, reactive oxygen species (ROS) production. In yeast cells, ROS accumulate under conditions of oxidative stress, which results in impaired mitochondrial function and a "petite" phenotype. However, petite yeast cells exhibit a longer lifespan than wild-type cells and indicate a protective function by VDAC1 in similar circumstances, such as aging.

=== Voltage gating ===
VDAC1 allows for the conductance of molecules into and out of the mitochondrion. Its permeability is dependent on VDAC1's conformational state which is determined by voltage. At low voltage (10mV), the pore is in an "open" state where the channel is weakly anion selective and allows for a greater flux of metabolites. Because of the large pore size, metabolic gating under saturated ATP conditions reveal a transport of 2,000,000 ATP/second and a transport of 10,000 ATP under physiological conditions. At a higher voltage in the positive or negative direction (>30mV), the pore is in a "closed" state and is weakly cation selective allowing for less metabolites to be transported. The flux of metabolites can be seen as negligible. This change in states is mediated by a conformational change in the protein that has yet to be discovered. Since the alpha helical N-terminus segment is located in the center of the pore, it is ideally situated for metabolic gating. This lead researchers to believe that the Alpha helix was a key contributor to determining the conformational states. However, more recent studies have shown the N-terminal is unnecessary for proper voltage gating and therefore suggest the flexible beta barrel as the mechanism of conformational change.

=== Oligomerization ===
Atomic Force Microscopy (AFM) revealed the presence of VDAC1 monomers as well as dimers and larger oligomers showcasing the interaction of the pore with itself, however, dimers are more frequent. hVDAC1 in particular has been shown to arrange in parallel dimers leading to increased permeability of the pore. The glutamate located at the 73rd position on VDAC1 has also been shown to play a role in oligomerization when in the presence of calcium. VDACs can also oligomerize to form part of the mitochondrial permeability transition pore (MPTP) and, thus, facilitate cytochrome C release, leading to apoptosis. VDACs have also been observed to interact with pro- or antiapoptotic proteins, such as Bcl-2 family proteins and kinases, and so may contribute to apoptosis independently from the MPTP.

== Clinical significance ==
The voltage dependent anion channels all function in ion and metabolite transport although their physiological roles are different. Because of their role, dysfunction of the channels can lead to various diseases. VDAC1 has been implicated in cancer through its interactions with the antiapoptotic family of proteins, Bcl-2 proteins, particularly Bcl-xl, and Mcl-1, which are overexpressed during cancer. These two Bcl-2 proteins interact with VDAC1 to regulate calcium ion transport across the OMM and, ultimately, ROS production. While high levels of ROS induce cell death, non-lethal levels interfere with signal transduction pathways that can then promote cell proliferation, migration, and invasion in cancer cells. Moreover, VDAC1 overexpression has been associated with increased apoptotic response and anti-cancer drugs and treatment efficacy, further supporting VDAC1 as a therapeutic target for cancer treatment.

VDAC1's function in calcium ion transport has also been linked to neurodegenerative diseases. In PD, VDAC1 increases calcium ion levels within the mitochondria, resulting in increased mitochondrial permeability, disrupted mitochondrial membrane potential, elevated ROS production, cell death, and neuronal degeneration. VDAC1 has been shown to interact with Amyloid β (Aβ) leading to increased conductance of the channel and eventually apoptosis of the cell. In experimental models of Huntington's disease, treatment with the VDAC-targeting compound olesoxime improved disease-associated phenotypes, possibly by modulating calcium homeostasis and the activity of calcium-dependent calpain proteases.

== Interactions ==
VDAC1 acts as a scaffold for many proteins as well as allows for the flux of ions and metabolites through interactions within the pore.

A major metabolite that moves through this channel is ATP. A low affinity binding site used for fast transport of this molecule was discovered by the Markov state modeling approach. It was shown that ATP binds to multiple basic residues within the pore sequentially, in essence moving through the channel.

VDAC1 has also been shown to interact with:

- BCL2-like 1,
- Bcl-2-associated X protein,
- DYNLT3,
- Gelsolin,
- PRKCE,
- HK1
- Parkin
- eNOS
- Mcl-1
- HK
- ATP
- GSK-3

== See also ==
- Voltage-dependent anion channel
