= Erastin =

Molecule initiating ferroptotic cell death

Legal status
- Legal status: Experimental

Identifiers
- IUPAC name: 2-[1-[4-[2-(4-Chlorophenoxy)acetyl]-1-piperazinyl]ethyl]-3-(2-ethoxyphenyl)-4(3H)-Quinazolinone
- CAS Number: 571203-78-6
- PubChem CID: 11214940
- ChemSpider: 9390002
- UNII: ZJA3NS42T9
- KEGG: C21478

Chemical and physical data
- Formula: C_{30}H_{31}ClN_{4}O_{4}
- Molar mass: 547.05 g·mol^{−1}
- 3D model (JSmol): Interactive image
- SMILES: O=C1N(C2=CC=CC=C2OCC)C(C(C)N3CCN(C(COC4=CC=C(Cl)C=C4)=O)CC3)=NC5=CC=CC=C51
- InChI: InChI=1S/C30H31ClN4O4/c1-3-38-27-11-7-6-10-26(27)35-29(32-25-9-5-4-8-24(25)30(35)37)21(2)33-16-18-34(19-17-33)28(36)20-39-23-14-12-22(31)13-15-23/h4-15,21H,3,16-20H2,1-2H3; Key:BKQFRNYHFIQEKN-UHFFFAOYSA-N

Erastin is a small molecule capable of initiating ferroptotic cell death. Erastin binds and activates voltage-dependent anion channels (VDAC) by reversing tubulin's inhibition on VDAC2 and VDAC3, and functionally inhibits the cystine-glutamate antiporter enzyme SLC7A11 Cells treated with erastin are deprived of cysteine and are unable to synthesize the antioxidant glutathione. Depletion of glutathione eventually leads to excessive lipid peroxidation and cell death.

Erastin was first described in 2003. Its name is short for "eradicator of RAS and ST-expressing cells".
