= Ferroptosis =

Type of programmed cell death

Ferroptosis (also known as oxytosis) is a type of programmed cell death dependent on iron and characterized by the accumulation of lipid peroxides. Ferroptosis is biochemically, genetically, and morphologically distinct from other forms of regulated cell death such as apoptosis and necroptosis. Ferroptosis can be initiated by the failure of the glutathione-dependent antioxidant defenses, resulting in unchecked lipid peroxidation and eventual cell death. Lipophilic antioxidants and iron chelators can prevent ferroptotic cell death.

Researchers have identified roles in which ferroptosis can contribute to the medical field, such as the development of cancer therapies. Ferroptosis activation plays a regulatory role on growth of tumor cells in the human body. However, the positive effects of ferroptosis could be potentially neutralized by its disruption of metabolic pathways and disruption of homeostasis in the human body. Since ferroptosis is a form of regulated cell death, some of the molecules that regulate ferroptosis are involved in metabolic pathways that regulate cysteine exploitation, glutathione state, nicotinamide adenine dinucleotide phosphate (NADP) function, lipid peroxidation, and iron homeostasis.

== History ==
In 1989, work by the groups of Joseph T. Coyle and Ronald Schnaar showed in a neuronal cell line that excess exposure to glutamate or lowered cystine causes a decrease in glutathione levels, an accumulation in intracellular peroxides, and cytotoxicity. Later work by Pamela Maher and David Schubert noted the distinction of this cell death process from apoptosis, describing it as oxidative glutamate toxicity or oxytosis. In 2012, a study by Brent Stockwell and Scott Dixon characterized the iron dependence of this cell death process and coined the term ferroptosis. Oxytosis and ferroptosis are now thought to be the same cell death mechanism.

Other early studies regarding the connection between iron and lipid peroxidation, cystine deprivation and oxidative cell death, the activity and importance of glutathione peroxidase 4 (GPX4), and the identification of small molecules that induce ferroptosis were key to the eventual characterization of ferroptosis.

== Mechanism ==
The hallmark feature of ferroptosis is the iron-dependent accumulation of oxidatively damaged phospholipids, i.e., lipid peroxides. The implication of Fenton chemistry via iron is crucial for the generation of reactive oxygen species and this feature can be exploited by sequestering iron in lysosomes. Reactive oxygen species (ROS) driving ferroptosis originate from three primary sources: the iron-dependent Fenton reaction, mitochondrial oxidative phosphorylation, and the NADPH oxidase (NOX) enzyme family. The NOX family, including NOX1, NOX2 (CYBB), and NOX4, transports electrons across the plasma membrane to produce superoxide and downstream ROS. The pentose phosphate pathway supplies NADPH, which serves as the essential electron donor for GPX4, FSP1/AIFM2, NOX, and POR — meaning that a higher intracellular NADPH ratio correlates with increased resistance to ferroptosis.

The incorporation of polyunsaturated fatty acids (PUFAs) into membrane phospholipids is a prerequisite for ferroptosis. Two key enzymes govern this process: acyl-CoA synthetase long-chain family member 4 (ACSL4) activates PUFAs such as arachidonic acid and adrenic acid, and lysophosphatidylcholine acyltransferase 3 (LPCAT3) incorporates these activated PUFAs into the phospholipid bilayer. Monounsaturated fatty acids (MUFAs), including oleic acid and palmitoleic acid, compete with PUFAs for membrane incorporation and suppress ferroptosis due to their lower susceptibility to peroxidation.

The supply of PUFAs for ferroptosis also depends on glutaminolysis — the uptake of glutamine via membrane transporters SLC38A1 and SLC1A5, its conversion to α-ketoglutarate, and subsequent mitochondrial catabolism to generate acetyl-CoA for fatty acid synthesis. This process is regulated by AMP-activated protein kinase (AMPK), which plays a dual role in ferroptosis through phosphorylation of either Beclin-1 or acetyl-CoA carboxylase. Under stress conditions, lipid droplets can also release free fatty acids, further amplifying lipid peroxidation.

Ferroptosis has been shown to involve distinct cellular organelles, which includes peroxisomes, mitochondria, the endoplasmic reticulum (ER) and lysosomes. It has been a debate in the scientific community as to where ferroptosis is initiated in the cell, and now research points to the lysosome, where the chemical environment (iron, pH an hydrogen peroxide) are favorable. Oxidation of phospholipids can occur when free radicals abstract electrons from a lipid molecule (typically affecting polyunsaturated fatty acids), thereby promoting their oxidation.

The primary cellular mechanism of protection against ferroptosis is mediated by the selenoprotein GPX4, a glutathione-dependent hydroperoxidase that converts lipid hydroperoxides into non-toxic lipid alcohols. The abundant lipid soluble vitamin α-tocopherol complements GPX4 by acting as a radical-trapping antioxidant for lipid peroxyl radicals, the chief membrane damaging species in ferroptosis that cannot be reduced by GPX4. Recently, a second parallel enzyme-dependent protective pathway was independently discovered by two labs that involves the oxidoreductase FSP1 (also known as AIFM2). FSP1 enzymatically reduces non-mitochondrial coenzyme Q_{10} (CoQ_{10}), thereby generating a potent lipophilic antioxidant that suppresses the propagation of lipid peroxides. Vitamin K is also reduced by FSP1 to a hydroquinone species that also acts as a radical-trapping antioxidant and suppressor of ferroptosis. A similar mechanism for a cofactor moonlighting as a diffusable antioxidant was discovered in the same year for tetrahydrobiopterin (BH_{4}), a product of the rate-limiting enzyme GTP cyclohydrolase 1 (GCH1). Hydropersulfides have been found to inhibit ferroptosis by acting as endogenous radical-trapping antioxidants.

Human prostate cancer cells undergoing ferroptosis

Replacing natural polyunsaturated fatty acids (PUFA) with deuterated PUFA (dPUFA), which have deuterium in place of the bis-allylic hydrogens, can prevent cell death induced by erastin or RSL3. These deuterated PUFAs effectively inhibit ferroptosis and various chronic degenerative diseases associated with ferroptosis.

Live-cell imaging has been used to observe the morphological changes that cells undergo during ferroptosis. Initially the cell contracts and then begins to swell. Perinuclear lipid assembly is observed immediately before ferroptosis occurs. After the process is complete, lipid droplets are redistributed throughout the cell (see GIF on right side).

== Biology ==
Ferroptosis was initially characterized in human cell lines and has been since found to occur in other mammals (mice), avians (chicken), worms (C. elegans), and plants (A. thaliana, T. aestivum L., and others). Ferroptosis has also been demonstrated in canine cancer cell models. There have been limited studies in other model organisms such as D. melanogaster. Elements related to components of the ferroptosis pathway have been identified in archaea, bacteria, and fungi, though it is unclear the extent to which ferroptosis occurs in these organisms. Further studies in this area may reveal an ancient origin for ferroptosis.

Unlike other forms of cell death, ferroptosis has been shown to propagate between cells in a wave-like manner. This phenomenon is promoted by secretion of galectin-13 during ferroptosis. Mechanistically, galectin-13 binds to CD44, inhibiting CD44-mediated membrane localization of SLC7A11.

=== In development ===
During embryonic development, many cells die via apoptosis and other cell death pathways for various purposes including morphogenesis tissue sculpting, controlling cell numbers, and quality control. In 2024, it was found that ferroptosis plays a role in normal physiology during embryonic development and muscle remodelling, propagating in millimeter-length waves through the developing avian limb. The exact pro-ferroptotic signal that is transmitted between cells and the manner by which these ferroptotic waves are bounded remain to be characterized.

=== In adult stem cells ===
Ferroptosis has emerged as a significant regulator of adult stem cell maintenance and tissue regeneration. In human hematopoietic stem cells (HSCs), a naturally low rate of protein synthesis creates a selective vulnerability to ferroptosis; key protective factors such as GPX4, SLC7A11, and ferritin are insufficiently produced, and blocking ferroptosis fully rescues HSC maintenance even without restoring protein synthesis rates. In muscle stem cells (MuSCs), age-related chronic inflammation drives an epigenetic erosion of the histone mark H4K20me1 by downregulating its methyltransferase Kmt5a. This leads to the transcriptional silencing of anti-ferroptotic genes, including Gpx4, Ftl1, and Gclc, resulting in intracellular iron accumulation, lipid peroxidation, and ferroptotic death of MuSCs. The resulting depletion of the MuSC pool impairs muscle regeneration and contributes to age-related sarcopenia. Long-term pharmacological inhibition of systemic inflammation or restoration of the Kmt5a–H4K20me1 axis has been shown to prevent MuSC ferroptosis and improve regenerative capacity in aged muscle tissue.

== Therapeutic relevance ==
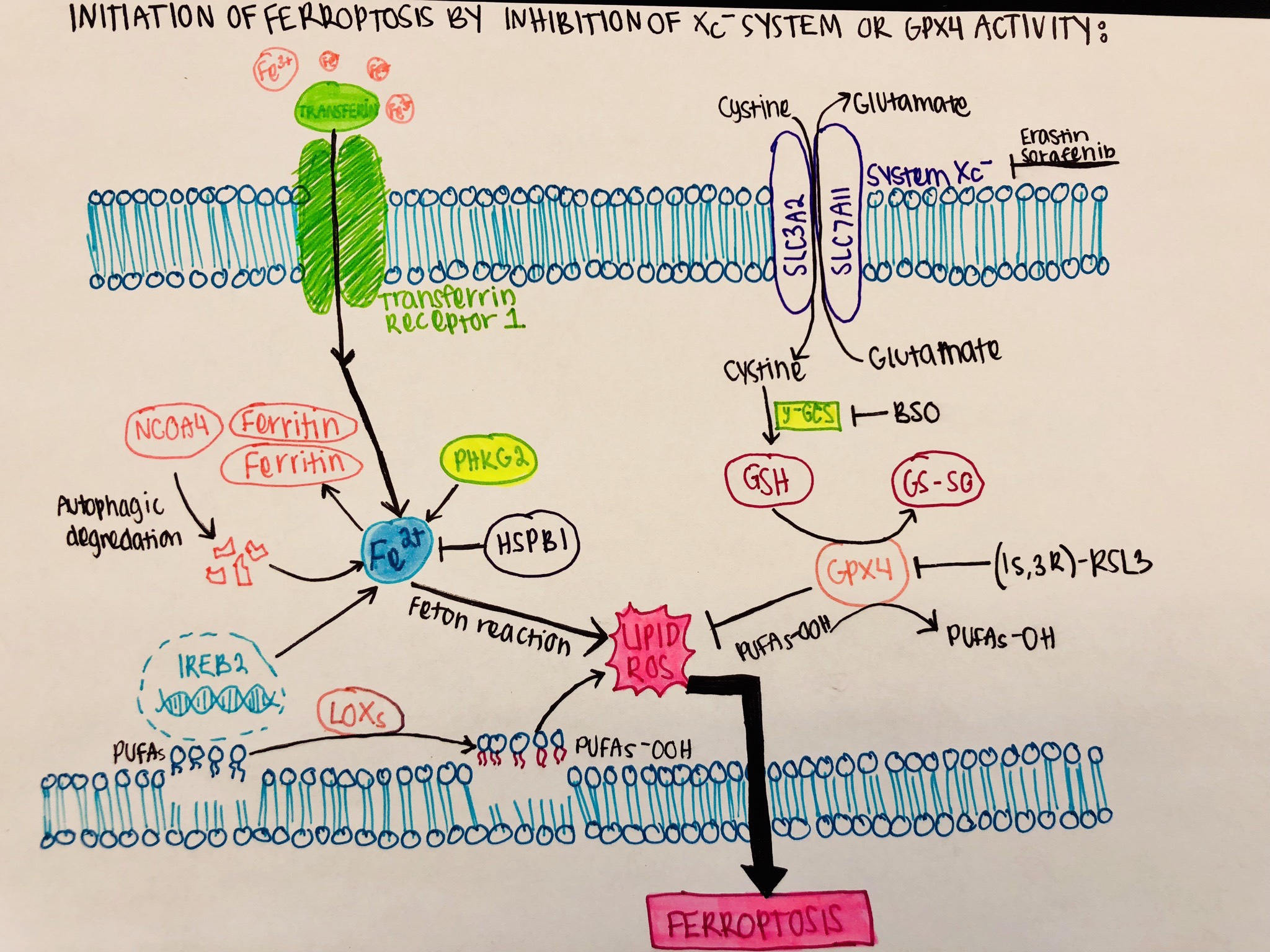
Initiation of ferroptosis by inhibition of Xc- system of GPX4 activity

Fundamental discoveries uncovering the biology of ferroptosis and translational studies showing the disease relevance of ferroptosis have motivated efforts to develop therapeutics that modulate ferroptosis. For example, Kojin Therapeutics and PTC Therapeutics are exploring ferroptosis modulation for treatment of cancer and Friedrich's ataxia. Ferroptosis has been implicated in a range of different diseases including cancer, ischemia/reperfusion injury (IRI), inflammation, neurodegeneration, and kidney injury.

=== Aging ===
Targeting ferroptosis has emerged as a strategy for mitigating age-related tissue decline. Chronic low-grade systemic inflammation (inflammaging), a hallmark of aging, has been identified as a primary trigger for ferroptotic death in muscle stem cell (MuSC) populations. In mice, long-term administration of the anti-inflammatory compound bindarit, initiated at midlife, suppresses age-associated inflammation and prevents the epigenetic erosion of the Kmt5a–H4K20me1 axis in MuSCs. This preserves the expression of the antioxidant enzyme GPX4, shielding the MuSC pool from iron-dependent lipid peroxidation and maintaining regenerative capacity during aging. More broadly, inhibition of ferroptosis — through radical-trapping antioxidants such as ferrostatin-1 and liproxstatin-1, or through iron chelation — extends lifespan and healthspan in model organisms such as Caenorhabditis elegans. In the context of osteoarthritis, senescent macrophages in skeletal muscle have been shown to promote ferroptosis in myofibers through iron overload and disruption of coenzyme Q10 biosynthesis, contributing to peri-articular muscle atrophy; treatment with CoQ10 attenuates this process.

=== Cancer ===
Ferroptosis has been explored as a strategy to selectively kill cancer cells.

ferroptosis has been implicated in several types of cancer, including:

- Breast
- Acute myeloid leukemia
- Pancreatic ductal adenocarcinoma
- Ovarian
- B-cell lymphoma
- Renal cell carcinomas
- Lung
- Glioblastoma

These forms of cancer have been hypothesized to be highly sensitive to ferroptosis induction. An upregulation of iron levels has also been seen to induce ferroptosis in certain types of cancer, such as breast cancer. Breast cancer cells have exhibited vulnerability to ferroptosis via a combination of siramesine and lapatinib. These cells also exhibited an autophagic cycle independent of ferroptotic activity, indicating that the two different forms of cell death could be controlled to activate at specific times following treatment. Furthermore, intratumor bacteria may scavenge iron by producing iron siderophores, which indirectly protect tumor cells from ferroptosis, emphasizing the need for ferroptosis inducers (thiostrepton) for cancer treatment.

In various contexts, resistance to cancer therapy is associated with a mesenchymal state. A pair of studies in 2017 found that these cancer cells in this therapy-induced drug-resistant state exhibit a greater dependence on GPX4 to suppress ferroptosis. Consequently, GPX4 inhibition represents a possible therapeutic strategy to mitigate acquired drug resistance.

=== Neurodegeneration ===
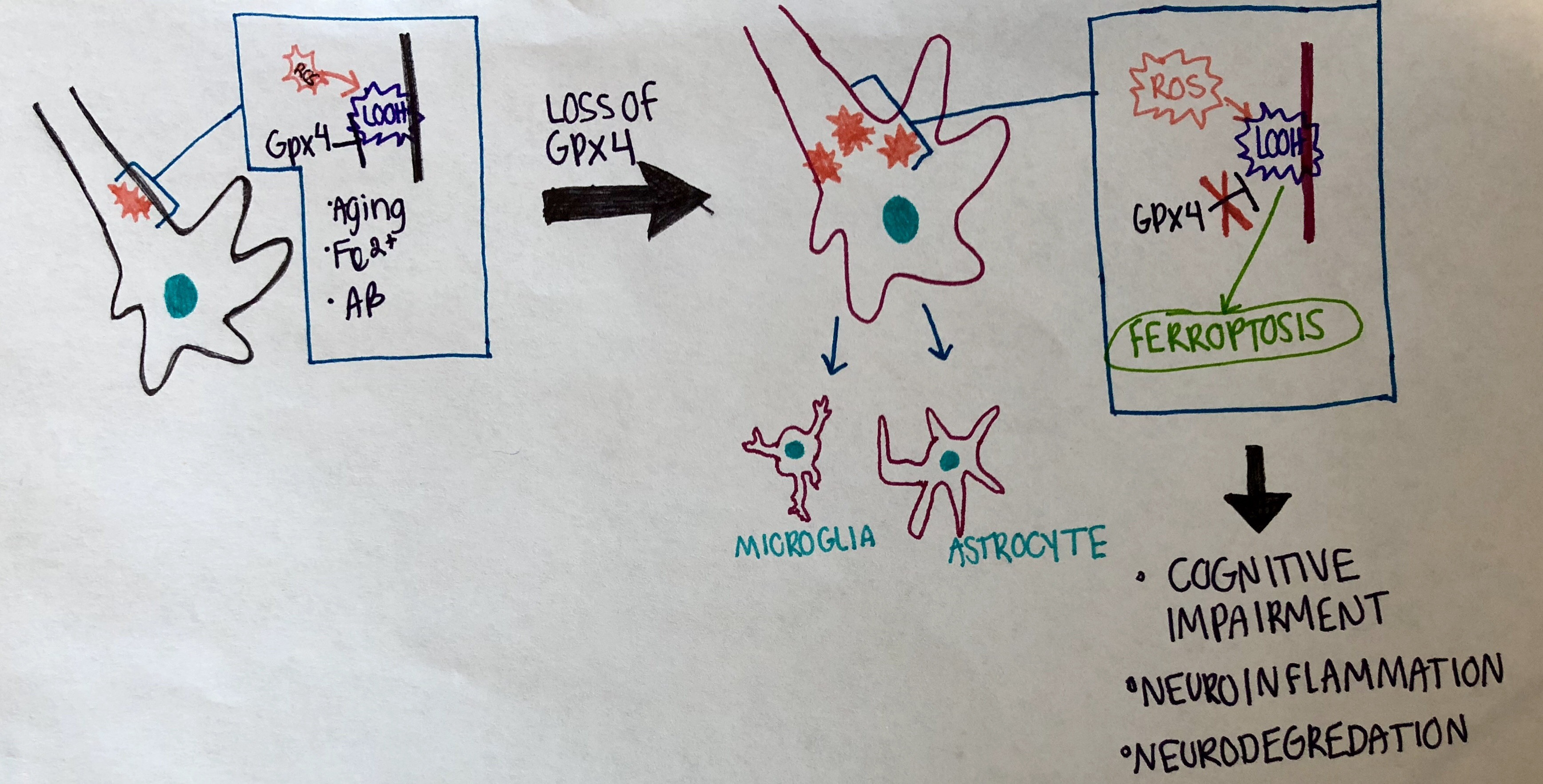
Induction of neurodegeneration by Ferroptosis

Neural connections are constantly changing within the nervous system. Synaptic connections that are used more often are kept intact and promoted, while synaptic connections that are rarely used are subject to degradation. Elevated levels of synaptic connection loss and degradation of neurons are linked to neurodegenerative diseases. More recently, ferroptosis has been linked to diverse brain diseases, in particular, Alzheimer's disease, amyotrophic lateral sclerosis (ALS), and Parkinson's disease. Two new studies show that ferroptosis contributes to neuronal death after intracerebral hemorrhage. Neurons that are degraded through ferroptosis release lipid metabolites from inside the cell body. The lipid metabolites are harmful to surrounding neurons, causing inflammation in the brain. Inflammation is a pathological feature of Alzheimer's disease and intracerebral hemorrhage.

Recent studies have suggested that ferroptosis contributes to neuronal cell death after traumatic brain injury. Hypoxic brain injury in resuscitated patients shows retrospective evidence of ferroptosis. Additionally there is evidence that the prion protein and pathogenic prions PrP^{Sc} contribute to ferroptosis sensitivity in the brain, a condition that is enhanced by RAC3 expression.

=== Acute kidney injury ===
Ferroptosis occurs during acute kidney injury in various cellular and animal models. Deficiencies in ferroptosis suppressor enzymes such as GPX4 and FSP1 sensitize kidneys to tubular ferroptosis during kidney IRI, thus inhibition of ferroptosis may be of therapeutic benefit. However, in premenopausal women this therapeutic potential might be limited due to intrinsic anti-ferroptotic effects of estrogen.

During chemotherapy treatment, ferroptosis contributes to acute kidney injury. Reagents to image ferroptosis have been developed to monitor anticancer drug-induced acute kidney injury in mouse models.

=== Immunology ===
Ferroptosis has been implicated in many immune processes including both adaptive and innate immunity and diseases such as infection and autoimmune disease.

==== Systemic lupus erythematosus ====
Systemic lupus erythematosus (SLE) is a chronic autoimmune disease. Studies have implicated a role for neutrophil death (NETosis) in SLE. Neutrophil ferroptosis is prevalent in patients with SLE and is induced by autoantibodies and interferon-alpha (IFN-α), which suppress GPX4 expression via the transcriptional repressor CREMα. Inhibition of ferroptosis was able to ameliorate SLE disease progression in the MRL/lpr mouse model of SLE.

==== Inflammatory bowel diseases ====
There is a genetic association between GPX4 and Crohn's disease. Subsequent study found that small intestinal epithelial cells (IECs) from Crohn's disease patient samples show reduced GPX4 expression and activity and lipid peroxidation. The same study found that dietary lipids in Western diets such as the PUFA arachidonic acid can trigger enteritis resembling Crohn's disease in a mouse model.

=== Biomarkers ===
Fatty acid-binding protein 5 (FABP5) has been reported as a stable biomarker of ferroptosis for retrospective pathological analyses.

== Small molecule modulators of ferroptosis ==
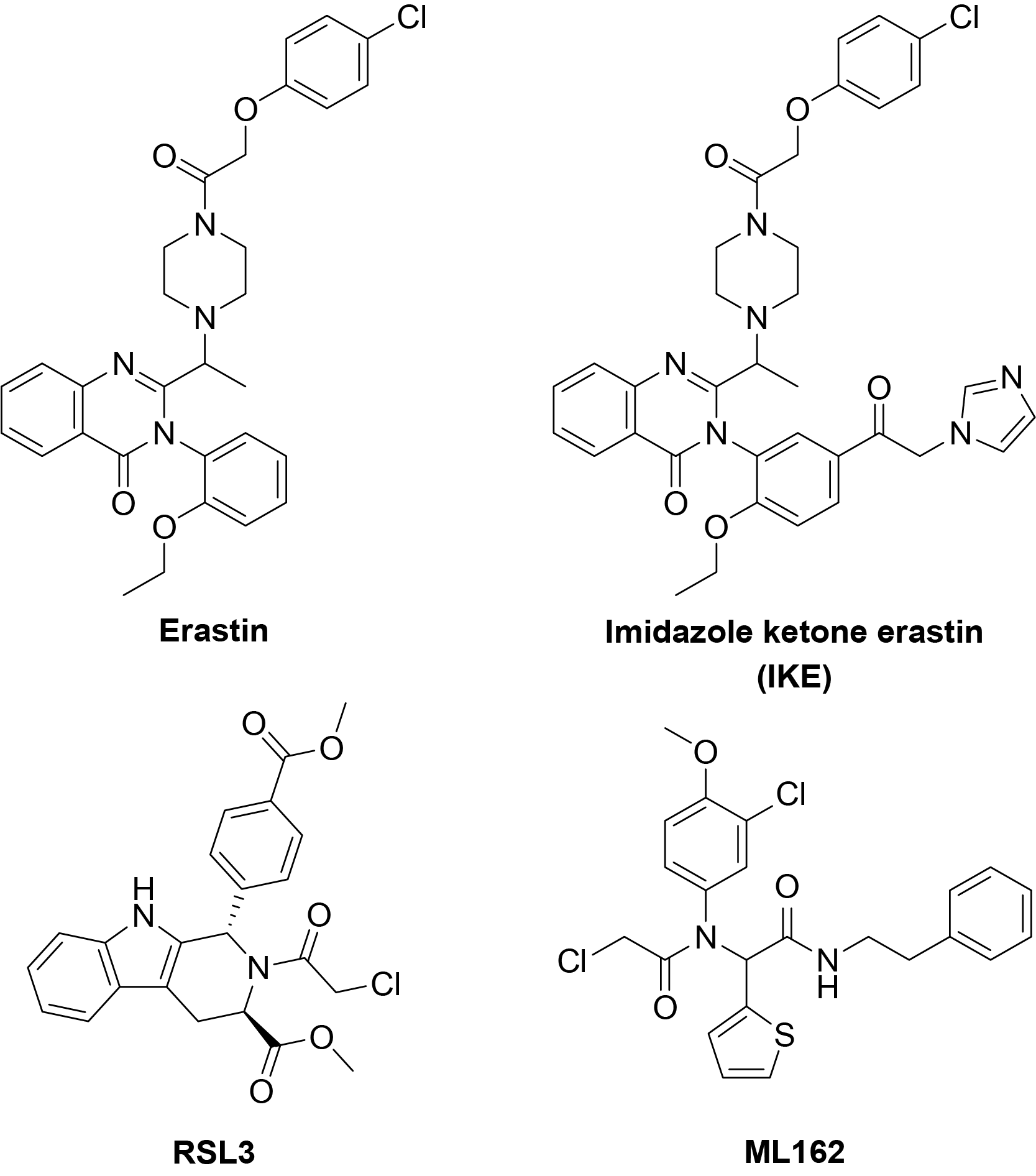
Structures of small molecule inducers of ferroptosis (erastin, IKE, RSL3, ML162)

=== Inducers ===
Many compounds commonly used in ferroptosis studies including erastin, RSL3 (RAS-selective lethal), ML162, and ML210 [from National Institutes of Health-Molecular Libraries Small Molecule Repository (NIH-MLSMR)] were initially identified in screens for compounds that can selectively kill cancerous mutant RAS cells.

Initial studies characterized the mitochondrial VDAC2 and VDAC3 as the targets of erastin, though it was later found that the mechanistic target of erastin is the cystine/glutamate transporter system x_{c}^{−}. Erastin inhibits system x_{c}^{−}, lowering intracellular GSH levels. Consequently, the GSH-dependent GPX4 is unable to detoxify lipid hydroperoxide species, leading to ferroptotic cell death. Derivatives of erastin have been prepared to improve aqueous solubility, potency, and metabolic stability, with imidazole ketone erastin (IKE) being the most extensively studied.

RSL3 and ML162 contain chloroacetamide moieties that can covalently react with nucleophilic residues. RSL3 and ML162 are able to bind to and inhibit GPX4 enzymatic activity or degrade GPX4 in lysate-based assays, though it has been found that RSL3 and ML162 do not inhibit purified GPX4 in vitro and target other selenoproteins such as thioredoxin reductase 1 (TXNRD1). However, other TXNRD1 inhibitors do not trigger ferroptosis, suggesting that TXNRD1 inhibition is not sufficient to trigger ferroptosis. The GPX4-inhibiting activity of RSL3 has also been suggested to be regulated by other factors such as 14-3-3ε or through broad targeting of the selenoproteome.

ML210 contains a nitroisoxazole group that acts as a masked nitrile-oxide electrophile. Specifically, in cellular and lysate contexts, ML210 undergoes ring-opening hydrolysis followed by a retro-Claisen-like condensation and ring-closing hydration to yield an unstable furoxan. Through a ring-opening tautomerization, this furoxan then yields a nitrile oxide that selectively reacts with selenocysteine residue 46 of GPX4.

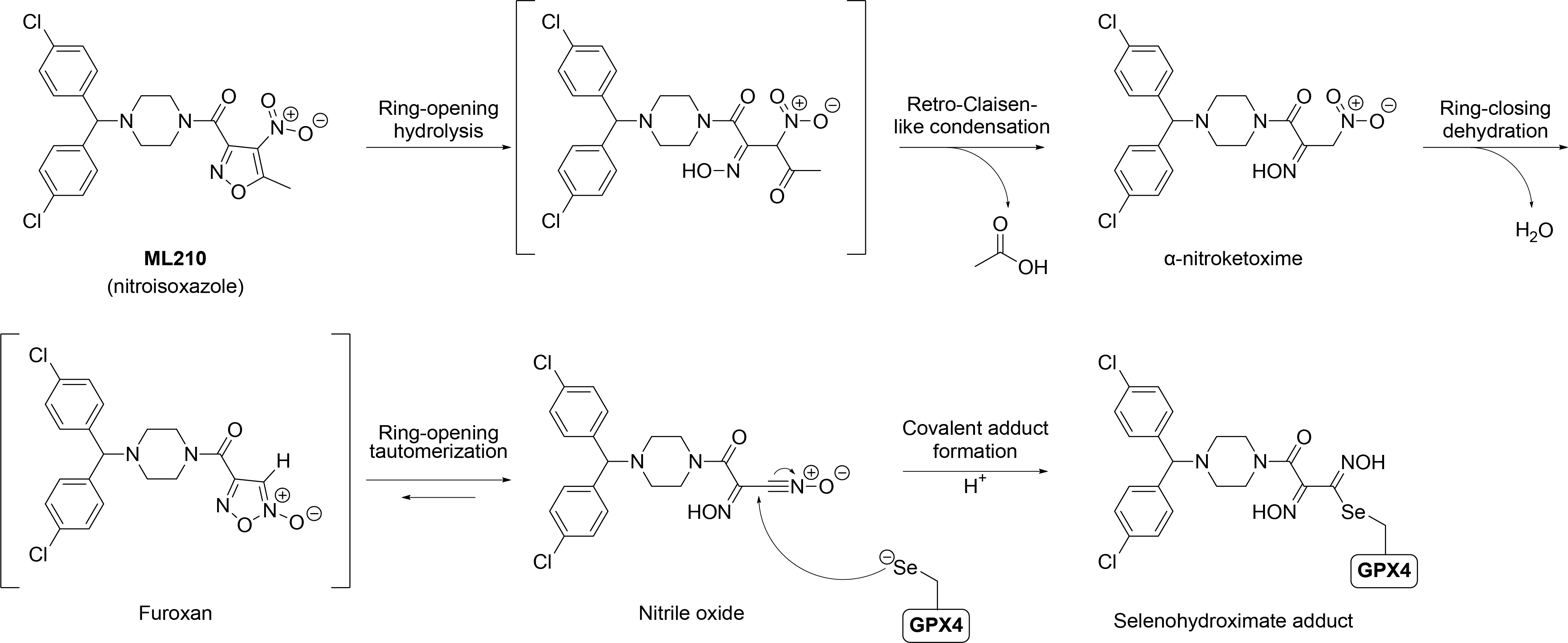
Mechanism of ML210 prodrug activation (adapted from PMID 32231343)

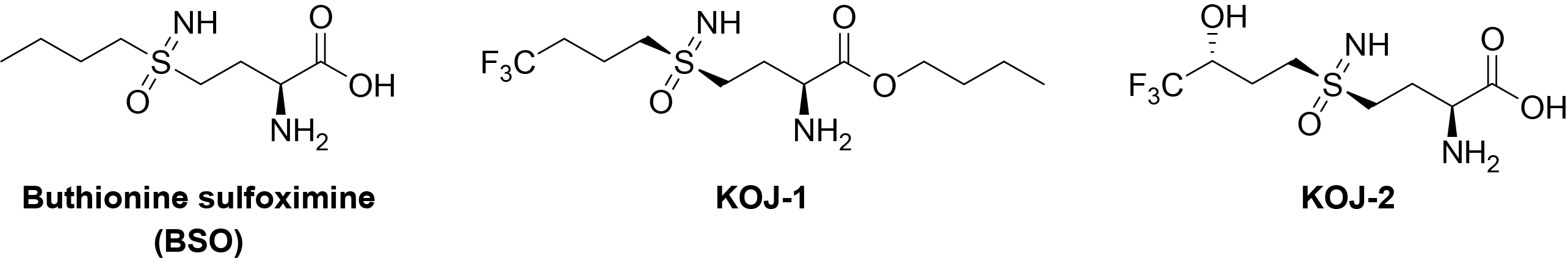
Structures of GCL inhibitors (BSO, KOJ-1, KOJ-2)

Upstream of GPX4, depletion of GSH by inhibiting GSH biosynthesis also induces ferroptosis. Work from Kojin Therapeutics and Ono Pharmaceutical has demonstrated that inhibition of glutamate-cysteine ligase (GCL), the rate-limiting enzyme in GSH biosynthesis, induces ferroptosis in cancer cell lines. GCL also suppresses ferroptosis through a GSH-independent mechanisms such as limiting glutamate accumulation. Buthionine sulfoximine (BSO) has been commonly used as a tool compound to inhibit GCL, though BSO is relatively low potency. Accordingly, analogues have been reported that show improved potency and pharmacological properties that may be used in in vivo studies.

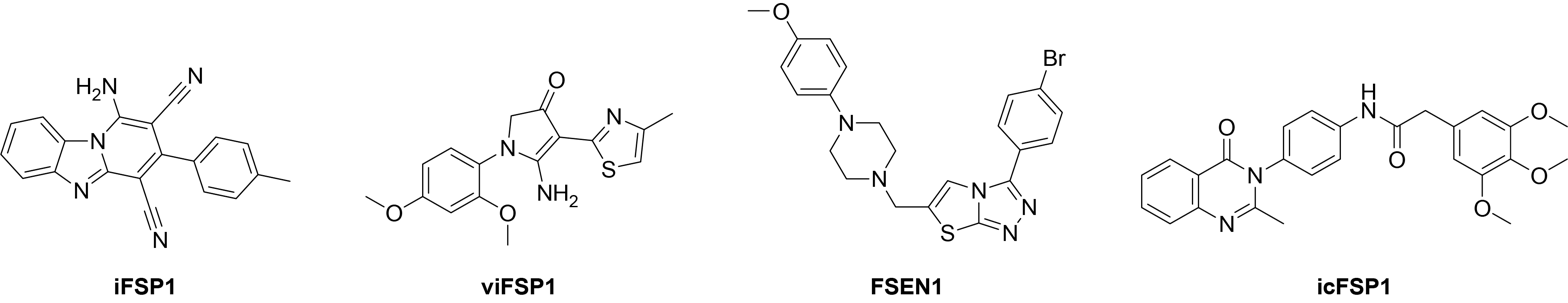
Structures of FSP1 inhibitors (iFSP1, viFSP1, FSEN1, icFSP1)

FSP1 inhibition is generally not sufficient to induce ferroptosis but FSP1 inhibitors such as iFSP1 (targeting the CoQ_{10} binding site) and viFSP1 (versatile inhibitor of FSP1; targeting the NAD(P)H binding pocket) have been explored as ferroptosis sensitizers. iFSP1 is not usable in rodent models, though viFSP1 is species-independent. FSEN1 is an uncompetitive inhibitor of FSP1 that binds to the FSP1–NADH–CoQ complex. 3-Phenylquinazolines (represented by icFSP1) do not competitively inhibit FSP1 enzymatic activity but rather trigger phase separation of FSP1 followed by induction of ferroptosis. Notably, FSP1 activity can compensate for GPX4 loss and suppress ferroptosis in certain contexts.

=== Inhibitors ===
Ferroptosis can be inhibited by lipophilic radical trapping antioxidants such as ferrostatin-1, liproxstatin-1, and vitamin E. Chelation of iron by agents such as desferrioxamine mesylate (DFO) also prevents lipid peroxidation and suppresses ferroptosis.

== See also ==
- Cystine/glutamate transporter (SLC7A11)
- Erastin
- Glutathione peroxidase 4 (GPX4)
- XJB-5-131
