= VDAC3 =

Protein-coding gene in the species Homo sapiens

Identifiers
- Aliases: VDAC3, HD-VDAC-3, voltage dependent anion channel 3
- External IDs: OMIM: 610029; MGI: 106922; GeneCards: VDAC3

Gene location (Human)
Chr.	Chromosome 8 (human)
Band	8p11.21	Start	42,391,624 bp
Band	8p11.21	End	42,405,937 bp

Gene location (Mouse)
Chr.	Chromosome 8 (mouse)
Band	8 A2|8 11.42 cM	Start	23,067,091 bp
Band	8 A2|8 11.42 cM	End	23,083,829 bp
RNA expression pattern
Bgee	Human / Mouse (ortholog); Top expressed in: Brodmann area 23; sperm; endothelial cell; pancreatic ductal cell; epithelium of nasopharynx; Skeletal muscle tissue of rectus abdominis; body of tongue; vastus lateralis muscle; lateral nuclear group of thalamus; pars compacta / Top expressed in: spermatid; quadriceps femoris muscle; spermatocyte; muscle of thigh; skeletal muscle tissue; neural tube; heart; mesencephalon; hypothalamus; ventricular zone; More reference expression data
BioGPS	n/a
Gene ontology
Molecular function	porin activity; nucleotide binding; voltage-gated anion channel activity; protein binding
Cellular component	integral component of membrane; mitochondrial outer membrane; extracellular exosome; pore complex; nucleus; membrane; mitochondrion; mitochondrial inner membrane
Biological process	regulation of cilium assembly; adenine transport; ion transport; transmembrane transport; regulation of anion transmembrane transport; anion transmembrane transport; behavioral fear response; chemical synaptic transmission; neuron-neuron synaptic transmission; learning; transport; inorganic anion transport
Sources:Amigo / QuickGO
Orthologs
Databases	NCBI: entry; OMA: entry
Species	Human	Mouse
Entrez	7419	22335
Ensembl	ENSG00000078668	ENSMUSG00000008892
UniProt	Q9Y277	Q60931
RefSeq (mRNA)	NM_001135694; NM_005662	NM_001198998; NM_011696
RefSeq (protein)	NP_001129166; NP_005653	NP_001185927; NP_035826
Location (UCSC)	Chr 8: 42.39 – 42.41 Mb	Chr 8: 23.07 – 23.08 Mb
PubMed search
- Wikidata
View/Edit Human	View/Edit Mouse

Voltage-dependent anion-selective channel protein 3 (VDAC3) is a protein that in humans is encoded by the VDAC3 gene on chromosome 8. The protein encoded by this gene is a voltage-dependent anion channel and shares high structural homology with the other VDAC isoforms. Nonetheless, VDAC3 demonstrates limited pore-forming ability in artificial membranes and, instead, interacts with other proteins to perform its biological functions, including sperm flagella assembly and centriole assembly. Mutations in VDAC3 have been linked to male infertility, as well as Parkinson's disease.

== Structure ==
The three VDAC isoforms in human are highly conserved, particularly with respect to their 3D structure. VDACs form a wide β-barrel structure, inside of which the N-terminal resides to partially close the pore. The sequence of the VDAC3 isoform contains an abundance of cysteines, which allow for the formation of disulfide bridges and, ultimately, affect the flexibility of the β-barrel. VDACs also contain a mitochondrial targeting sequence for the protein's translocation to the outer mitochondrial membrane. VDAC3 still yet possesses multiple isoforms, including a full-length form and shorter form termed VDAC3b. This shorter form is predominantly expressed over the full-length form at cell centrosomes.

== Function ==
VDAC3 belongs to the mitochondrial porin family and is expected to share similar biological functions to the other VDAC isoforms. VDACs are involved in cell metabolism by transporting ATP and other small metabolites across the outer mitochondrial membrane. In addition, VDACs form part of the mitochondrial permeability transition pore (MPTP) and, thus, facilitate cytochrome C release, leading to apoptosis. VDACs have also been observed to interact with pro- or antiapoptotic proteins, such as Bcl-2 family proteins and kinases, and so may contribute to apoptosis independently from the MPTP. Nonetheless, experiments reveal a lack of pore-forming ability in the VDAC3 isoform, suggesting that it may perform different biological functions. Notably, though all VDAC isoforms are ubiquitously expressed, VDAC3 is mostly found in the sperm outer dense fiber (ODF), where it is hypothesized to promote proper assembly and maintenance of sperm flagella. Because the ODF membranes are not likely to support pore formation, VDAC3 may interact with protein partners to carry out other functions in the ODF. For instance, within cells, VDAC3 predominantly localizes to the centrosome and recruits Mps1 to regulate centriole assembly. In the case of localization to the mitochondria, VDAC3 interaction with Mps1 instead leads to ciliary disassembly.

== Clinical significance ==
VDAC3 belongs to a group of mitochondrial membrane channels involved in translocation of adenine nucleotides through the outer membrane. These channels may also function as a mitochondrial binding site for hexokinase and glycerol kinase. The VDAC is an important constituent in apoptotic signaling and oxidative stress, most notably as part of the mitochondrial death pathway and cardiac myocyte apoptosis signaling. Programmed cell death is a distinct genetic and biochemical pathway essential to metazoans. An intact death pathway is required for successful embryonic development and the maintenance of normal tissue homeostasis. Apoptosis has proven to be tightly interwoven with other essential cell pathways. The identification of critical control points in the cell death pathway has yielded fundamental insights for basic biology, as well as provided rational targets for new therapeutics a normal embryologic processes, or during cell injury (such as ischemia-reperfusion injury during heart attacks and strokes) or during developments and processes in cancer, an apoptotic cell undergoes structural changes including cell shrinkage, plasma membrane blebbing, nuclear condensation, and fragmentation of the DNA and nucleus. This is followed by fragmentation into apoptotic bodies that are quickly removed by phagocytes, thereby preventing an inflammatory response. It is a mode of cell death defined by characteristic morphological, biochemical and molecular changes. It was first described as a "shrinkage necrosis", and then this term was replaced by apoptosis to emphasize its role opposite mitosis in tissue kinetics. In later stages of apoptosis the entire cell becomes fragmented, forming a number of plasma membrane-bounded apoptotic bodies which contain nuclear and or cytoplasmic elements. The ultrastructural appearance of necrosis is quite different, the main features being mitochondrial swelling, plasma membrane breakdown and cellular disintegration. Apoptosis occurs in many physiological and pathological processes. It plays an important role during embryonal development as programmed cell death and accompanies a variety of normal involutional processes in which it serves as a mechanism to remove "unwanted" cells.

In addition, VDAC3 has been implicated in cardioprotection against ischemia-reperfusion injury, such as during ischemic preconditioning of the heart. Although a large burst of reactive oxygen species is known to lead to cell damage, a moderate release of ROS from the mitochondria, which occurs during nonlethal short episodes of ischemia, can play a significant triggering role in the signal transduction pathways of ischemic preconditioning leading to reduction of cell damage. It has even been observed that during this release of reactive oxygen species, VDAC3 plays an important role in the mitochondrial cell death pathway transduction hereby regulating apoptotic signaling and cell death.

As VDAC3 is a regulator of sperm motility, male mice missing VDAC3 result in infertility. Mutations in VDAC3 are also associated with Parkinson's disease, as VDAC3 has been observed to target Parkin to defective mitochondria to eliminate them by mitophagy. Failure to eliminate these mitochondria result in the accumulation of reactive oxygen species, the commonly attributed cause of Parkinson's disease. In addition, it has been found that VDAC3-null mice were born at the expected mendelian ratio. Mutant females were fertile, but males were not due to markedly reduced sperm motility. The majority of epididymal axonemes showed structural defects, most commonly loss of a single microtubule doublet at a conserved position within the axoneme. In testicular sperm, the defect was only rarely observed, suggesting that instability of a normally formed axoneme occurred during sperm maturation. In contrast, tracheal epithelial cilia showed no structural abnormalities, but there was a reduced number of ciliated cells. In skeletal muscle, mitochondria were abnormally shaped, and the activities of respiratory chain complex enzymes were reduced. Citrate synthase activity was unchanged, suggesting an absence of mitochondrial proliferation that commonly occurs in response to respiratory chain defects.

== Interactions ==
VDAC3 has been shown to interact with:

- Mps1
- Parkin

== See also ==
- Voltage-dependent anion channel
