= Genderblind =

Identifiers
- Organism: Drosophila melanogaster
- Symbol: gb
- UniProt: Q9VB75
Search for
- Structures: Swiss-model
- Domains: InterPro

Genderblind, also known as CG6070, is a gene that was discovered in Drosophila melanogaster by University of Illinois at Chicago researcher David Featherstone. The gene encodes a member of the cystine/glutamate transporter family of proteins.

Genderblind protein is expressed in glial cells where it secretes the neurotransmitter glutamate and regulates the organization of glutamate receptors.

A mutation in Genderblind alters the sexual behavior of Drosophila, turning the flies bisexual. Drosophila given drugs to alter synapse strength, independent of the Genderblind mutation, allowed researchers to "turn fly homosexuality on and off, within hours". The researchers believe this effect is due to the flies' altered response to pheromones.
