= LGALS13 =

Protein-coding gene in the species Homo sapiens

Identifiers
- Aliases: LGALS13, GAL13, PLAC8, PP13, galectin 13
- External IDs: OMIM: 608717; GeneCards: LGALS13
Available structures
PDB	Human UniProt search: PDBe RCSB
PDB	List of PDB id codes 1F87

Gene location (Human)
Chr.	Chromosome 19 (human)
Band	19q13.2	Start	39,602,524 bp
Band	19q13.2	End	39,607,474 bp
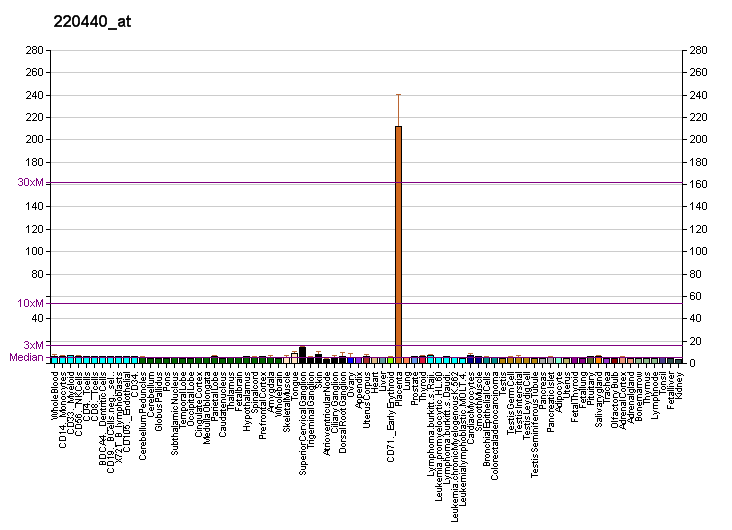
RNA expression pattern
Bgee	Human / Mouse (ortholog); Top expressed in: placenta; thymus; striated muscle tissue; skeletal muscle tissue; thigh; muscle of thigh; cerebellum; cerebellar cortex; right hemisphere of cerebellum; hypothalamus / n/a; More reference expression data
BioGPS	More reference expression data
Gene ontology
Molecular function	lysophospholipase activity; protein binding; carbohydrate binding
Cellular component	cytoplasm; nuclear matrix; nucleus
Biological process	phospholipid metabolic process; positive regulation of T cell apoptotic process; apoptotic process
Sources:Amigo / QuickGO
Orthologs
Databases	NCBI: entry; OMA: entry
Species	Human	Mouse
Entrez	29124	n/a
Ensembl	ENSG00000105198	n/a
UniProt	Q9UHV8	n/a
RefSeq (mRNA)	NM_013268	n/a
RefSeq (protein)	NP_037400	n/a
Location (UCSC)	Chr 19: 39.6 – 39.61 Mb	n/a
PubMed search		n/a
- Wikidata
View/Edit Human

Placental protein 13 (PP13, also known as galectin-13) is a protein that in humans is encoded by the LGALS13 gene.

== Structure and function ==
It is composed of two identical subunits which are held together by disulfide bonds. The monomer of this protein has structural similarity to several members of the beta-galactoside-binding S-type lectin family, but it could not bind beta-galactoside. This is because the ligand binding site is lack of key residue for binding beta-galactoside. It is a galectin-like protein.

Galectin-13 has been shown to bind CD44, inhibiting membrane localization of SLC7A11 and promoting propagation of ferroptosis.

== Clinical significance ==
PP13 levels that are low in the first trimester of pregnancy confers a higher risk for developing pre-eclampsia later in pregnancy.
