= Empesertib =

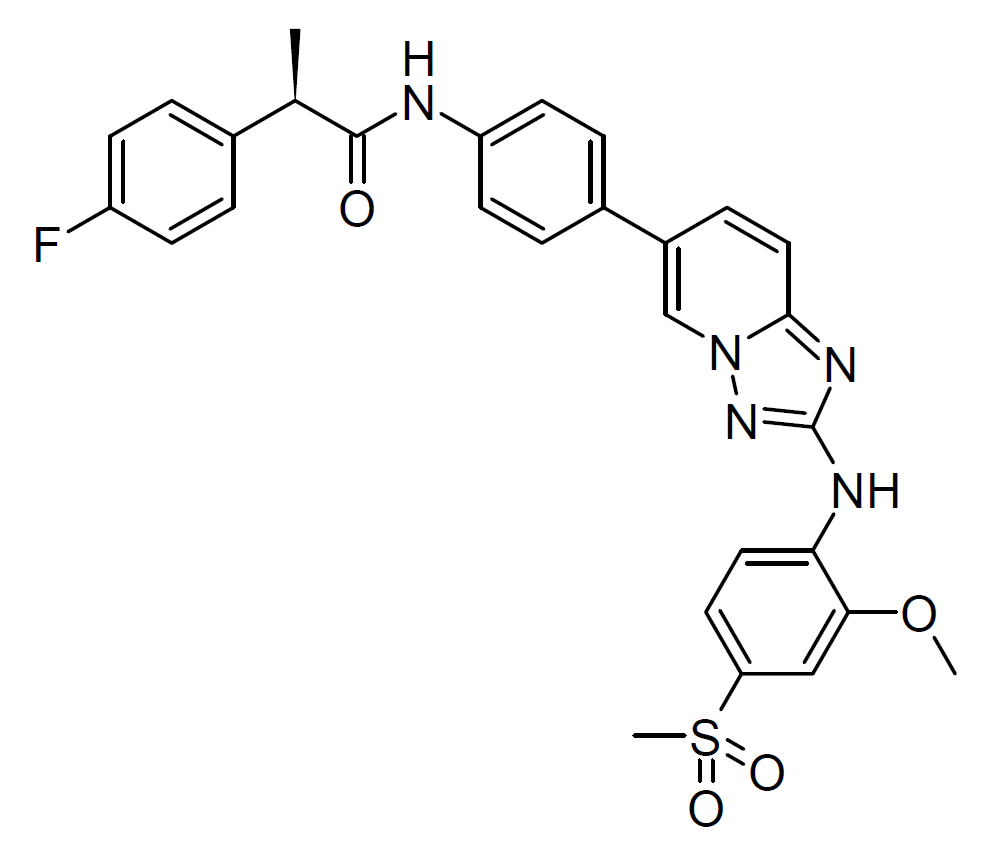

Identifiers
- IUPAC name: (2R)-2-(4-fluorophenyl)-N-[4-[2-(2-methoxy-4-methylsulfonylanilino)-[1,2,4]triazolo[1,5-a]pyridin-6-yl]phenyl]propanamide
- CAS Number: 1443763-60-7
- PubChem CID: 71599640
- IUPHAR/BPS: 9427
- ChemSpider: 35308224
- UNII: 02Y3Z2756M
- ChEMBL: ChEMBL4303241

Chemical and physical data
- Formula: C_{29}H_{26}FN_{5}O_{4}S
- Molar mass: 559.62 g·mol^{−1}
- 3D model (JSmol): Interactive image
- SMILES: C[C@H](C1=CC=C(C=C1)F)C(=O)NC2=CC=C(C=C2)C3=CN4C(=NC(=N4)NC5=C(C=C(C=C5)S(=O)(=O)C)OC)C=C3
- InChI: InChI=1S/C29H26FN5O4S/c1-18(19-4-9-22(30)10-5-19)28(36)31-23-11-6-20(7-12-23)21-8-15-27-33-29(34-35(27)17-21)32-25-14-13-24(40(3,37)38)16-26(25)39-2/h4-18H,1-3H3,(H,31,36)(H,32,34)/t18-/m1/s1; Key:NRJKIOCCERLIDG-GOSISDBHSA-N

Empesertib (BAY1161909) is an experimental drug which acts as a selective inhibitor of the enzyme monopolar spindle 1 kinase (MPS1). It is in clinical trials for the treatment of breast cancer.
