= XJB-5-131 =

Chemical compound

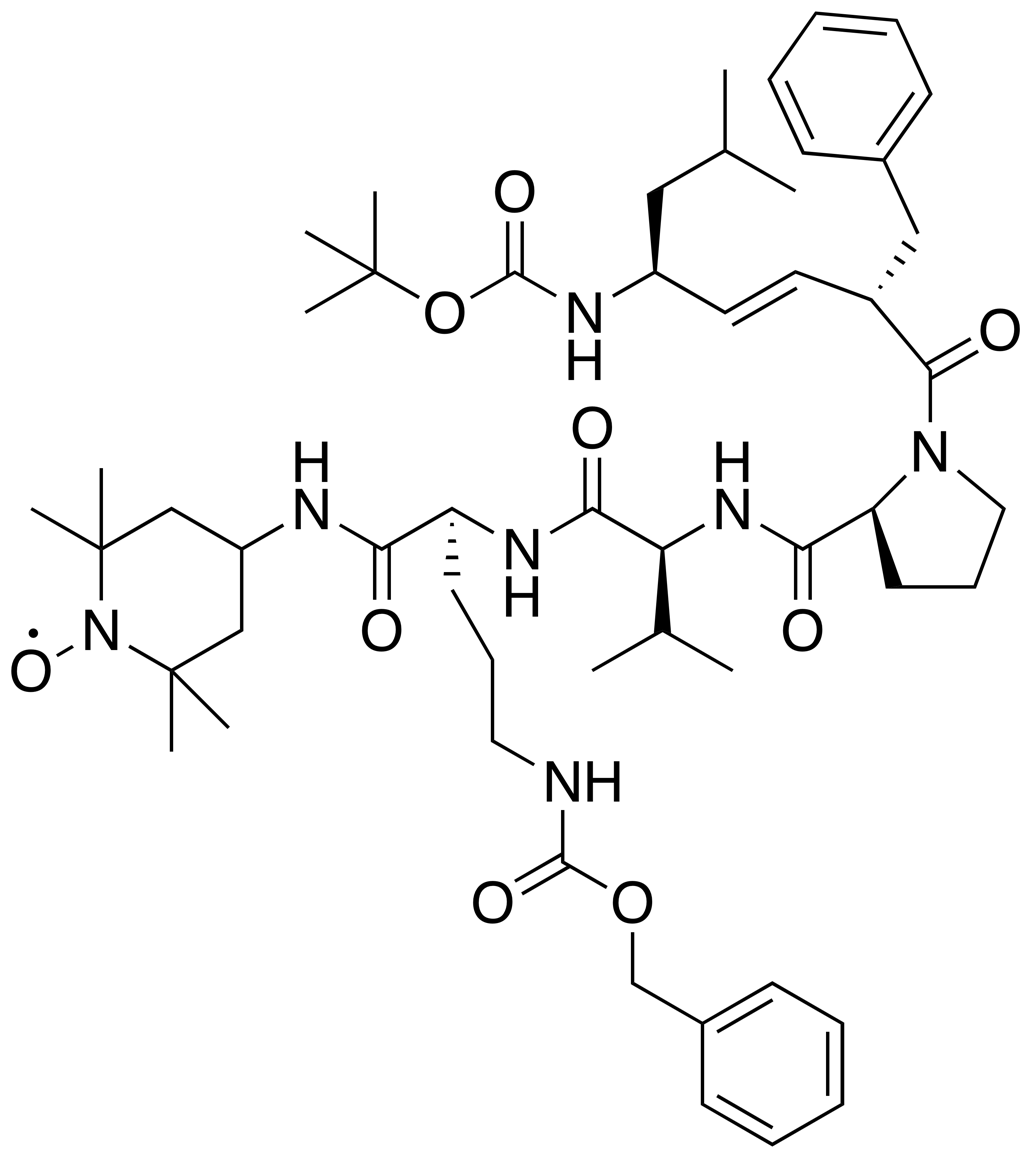

Legal status
- Legal status: experimental

Identifiers
- CAS Number: 866404-31-1
- PubChem CID: 11693686
- ChemSpider: 9868412
- ChEBI: CHEBI:173099

Chemical and physical data
- Formula: C_{53}H_{80}N_{7}O_{9}
- Molar mass: 959.263 g·mol^{−1}
- 3D model (JSmol): Interactive image
- SMILES: CC(C)CC(C=CC(Cc1ccccc1)C(=O)N2CCCC2C(=O)NC(C(C)C)C(=O)NC(CCCNC(=O)OCc3ccccc3)C(=O)NC4CC(N(C(C4)(C)C)[O])(C)C)NC(=O)OC(C)(C)C
- InChI: InChI=1S/C53H80N7O9/c1-35(2)30-40(56-50(66)69-51(5,6)7)27-26-39(31-37-20-14-12-15-21-37)48(64)59-29-19-25-43(59)46(62)58-44(36(3)4)47(63)57-42(24-18-28-54-49(65)68-34-38-22-16-13-17-23-38)45(61)55-41-32-52(8,9)60(67)53(10,11)33-41/h12-17,20-23,26-27,35-36,39-44H,18-19,24-25,28-34H2,1-11H3,(H,54,65)(H,55,61)(H,56,66)(H,57,63)(H,58,62)/b27-26+/t39-,40-,42+,43+,44+/m1/s1; Key:VDQKIDYOPUMJGQ-VQPCLXHQSA-N

XJB-5-131 is a mitochondria-targeted synthetic nitroxide antioxidant. The molecule is composed of two parts: a peptide isostere delivery component. Peptide was drawn from the cyclopeptide antibiotic gramicidin S, that targets the inner mitochondrial membrane. And the second part is a 2,2,6,6-tetramethylpiperidine-1-oxyl (TEMPO) nitroxide radical scavenger that disregards any oxygen species that are reactive.

In a mouse model of Huntington's disease, XJB-5-131 has been seen to suppress somatic CAG repeat expansion by disturbing the toxic oxidation cycle. This process uses excision repair and mismatch repair pathway to promote oxidative DNA damage. Therefore XJB-5-131 is seen to reduce oxidative damage to mitochondrial DNA, and to maintain mitochondrial DNA copy number. XJB-5-131 also strongly protects against ferroptosis, a form of iron-dependent regulated cell death.
