= VDAC2 =

Protein-coding gene in the species Homo sapiens

Identifiers
- Aliases: VDAC2, POR, voltage dependent anion channel 2
- External IDs: OMIM: 193245; MGI: 106915; GeneCards: VDAC2

Gene location (Human)
Chr.	Chromosome 10 (human)
Band	10q22.2	Start	75,210,154 bp
Band	10q22.2	End	75,231,448 bp

Gene location (Mouse)
Chr.	Chromosome 14 (mouse)
Band	14 A3|14 11.91 cM	Start	21,875,306 bp
Band	14 A3|14 11.91 cM	End	21,895,947 bp
RNA expression pattern
Bgee	Human / Mouse (ortholog); Top expressed in: mucosa of esophagus; gastrocnemius muscle; left ventricle; ganglionic eminence; right auricle of heart; muscle of thigh; apex of heart; muscle layer of sigmoid colon; rectum; vagina / Top expressed in: epithelium of stomach; spermatid; endocardial cushion; atrioventricular valve; seminiferous tubule; mucous cell of stomach; pyloric antrum; right ventricle; migratory enteric neural crest cell; vastus lateralis muscle; More reference expression data
BioGPS	n/a
Gene ontology
Molecular function	porin activity; nucleotide binding; voltage-gated anion channel activity; protein binding
Cellular component	integral component of membrane; membrane; synaptic vesicle; myelin sheath; mitochondrial outer membrane; mitochondrion; mitochondrial inner membrane; membrane raft; mitochondrial nucleoid; extracellular exosome; pore complex; nucleus; acrosomal vesicle
Biological process	negative regulation of intrinsic apoptotic signaling pathway; ion transport; transmembrane transport; negative regulation of protein polymerization; regulation of anion transmembrane transport; anion transport; anion transmembrane transport; transport; binding of sperm to zona pellucida; inorganic anion transport
Sources:Amigo / QuickGO
Orthologs
Databases	NCBI: entry; OMA: entry
Species	Human	Mouse
Entrez	7417	22334
Ensembl	ENSG00000165637	ENSMUSG00000021771
UniProt	P45880; Q5JSD1	Q60930
RefSeq (mRNA)	NM_001184783; NM_001184823; NM_003375; NM_001324087; NM_001324088 NM_001324089; NM_001324090; NM_001391963	NM_011695
RefSeq (protein)	NP_001171712; NP_001171752; NP_001311016; NP_001311017; NP_001311018 NP_001311019; NP_003366	NP_035825
Location (UCSC)	Chr 10: 75.21 – 75.23 Mb	Chr 14: 21.88 – 21.9 Mb
PubMed search
- Wikidata
View/Edit Human	View/Edit Mouse

Voltage-dependent anion-selective channel protein 2 is a protein that in humans is encoded by the VDAC2 gene on chromosome 10. This protein is a voltage-dependent anion channel and shares high structural homology with the other VDAC isoforms. VDACs are generally involved in the regulation of cell metabolism, mitochondrial apoptosis, and spermatogenesis. Additionally, VDAC2 participates in cardiac contractions and pulmonary circulation, which implicate it in cardiopulmonary diseases. VDAC2 also mediates immune response to infectious bursal disease (IBD).

== Structure ==
The three VDAC isoforms in human are highly conserved, particularly with respect to their 3D structure. VDACs form a wide β-barrel structure, inside of which the N-terminal resides to partially close the pore. The sequence of the VDAC2 isoform contains an abundance of cysteines, which allow for the formation of disulfide bridges and, ultimately, affect the flexibility of the β-barrel. VDACs also contain a mitochondrial targeting sequence for the protein's translocation to the outer mitochondrial membrane. In particular, VDAC2 possesses an N-terminal longer by 11 residues compared to the other two isoforms.

== Function ==
VDAC2 belongs to the mitochondrial porin family and is expected to share similar biological functions to the other VDAC isoforms. VDACs generally are involved in cellular energy metabolism by transporting ATP and other small ions and metabolites across the outer mitochondrial membrane. In mammalian cardiomyocytes, VDAC2 promotes mitochondrial transport of calcium ions in order to power cardiac contractions.

In addition, VDACs form part of the mitochondrial permeability transition pore (MPTP) and, thus, facilitate cytochrome C release, leading to apoptosis. VDACs have also been observed to interact with pro- or antiapoptotic proteins, such as Bcl-2 family proteins and kinases, and so may contribute to apoptosis independently from the MPTP. VDAC2 in particular has demonstrated a protective effect in cells undergoing mitochondrial apoptosis, and may even confer protection during aging.

Furthermore, VDAcs have been linked to spermatogenesis, sperm maturation, motility, and fertilization. Though all VDAC isoforms are ubiquitously expressed, VDAC2 is majorly found in the sperm outer dense fiber (ODF), where it is hypothesized to promote proper assembly and maintenance of sperm flagella. It also localizes to the acrosomal membrane of the sperm, where it putatively mediates calcium ion transmembrane transport.

== Clinical significance ==
The VDAC2 protein belongs to a group of mitochondrial membrane channels involved in translocation of adenine nucleotides through the outer membrane. These channels may also function as a mitochondrial binding site for hexokinase and glycerol kinase. The VDAC is an important constituent in apoptotic signaling and oxidative stress, most notably as part of the mitochondrial death pathway and cardiac myocyte apoptosis signaling. Programmed cell death is a distinct genetic and biochemical pathway essential to metazoans. An intact death pathway is required for successful embryonic development and the maintenance of normal tissue homeostasis. Apoptosis has proven to be tightly interwoven with other essential cell pathways. The identification of critical control points in the cell death pathway has yielded fundamental insights for basic biology, as well as provided rational targets for new therapeutics a normal embryologic processes, or during cell injury (such as ischemia-reperfusion injury during heart attacks and strokes) or during developments and processes in cancer, an apoptotic cell undergoes structural changes including cell shrinkage, plasma membrane blebbing, nuclear condensation, and fragmentation of the DNA and nucleus. This is followed by fragmentation into apoptotic bodies that are quickly removed by phagocytes, thereby preventing an inflammatory response. It is a mode of cell death defined by characteristic morphological, biochemical and molecular changes. It was first described as a "shrinkage necrosis", and then this term was replaced by apoptosis to emphasize its role opposite mitosis in tissue kinetics. In later stages of apoptosis the entire cell becomes fragmented, forming a number of plasma membrane-bounded apoptotic bodies which contain nuclear and or cytoplasmic elements. The ultrastructural appearance of necrosis is quite different, the main features being mitochondrial swelling, plasma membrane breakdown and cellular disintegration. Apoptosis occurs in many physiological and pathological processes. It plays an important role during embryonal development as programmed cell death and accompanies a variety of normal involutional processes in which it serves as a mechanism to remove "unwanted" cells.

The VDAC2 protein has been implicated in cardioprotection against ischemia-reperfusion injury, such as during ischemic preconditioning of the heart. Although a large burst of reactive oxygen species (ROS) is known to lead to cell damage, a moderate release of ROS from the mitochondria, which occurs during nonlethal short episodes of ischemia, can play a significant triggering role in the signal transduction pathways of ischemic preconditioning leading to reduction of cell damage. It has even been observed that during this release of reactive oxygen species, VDAC2 plays an important role in the mitochondrial cell death pathway transduction hereby regulating apoptotic signaling and cell death.

The VDAC2 protein has been linked persistent pulmonary hypertension of the newborn (PPHN), which causes a large majority of neonatal morbidity and mortality, due to its role as a major regulator of endothelium-dependent nitric oxide synthase (eNOS) in the pulmonary endothelium. eNOS has been attributed with regulating NOS activity in response to physiological stimuli, which is vital to maintain NO production for proper blood circulation to the lungs. As a result, VDAC2 is significantly involved in pulmonary circulation and may become a therapeutic target for treating diseases such as pulmonary hypertension,

VDAC2 may also serve an immune function, as it has been hypothesized to detect and induce apoptosis in cells infected by the IBD virus. IBD, the equivalent HIV in birds, can compromise their immune systems and even cause fatal injury to the lymphoid organ, Studies of this process indicate that VDAC2 interacts with the viral protein V5 to mediate cell death.

== Interactions ==
VDAC2 has been shown to interact with:

- BAK
- Parkin
- eNOS

== See also ==
- Voltage-dependent anion channel
