= Glycerol kinase 3 =

Enzyme found in humans

GK3

Identifiers
- Aliases: GK3, glycerol kinase 3
- External IDs: OMIM: 600149; GeneCards: GK3
Enzyme activity
EC #	BRENDA	ExPASy	KEGG	MetaCyc
2.7.1.30	↗	↗	↗	↗

Gene location (Human)
Chr.	Chromosome 4 (human)
Band	4q32.3	Start	165,277,812 bp
Band	4q32.3	End	165,279,679 bp
RNA expression pattern
Bgee	Human / Mouse (ortholog); Top expressed in: testicle; left testis; right testis; bone marrow cell; corpus callosum; tonsil; blood; liver; duodenum; cervix / n/a; More reference expression data
BioGPS	n/a
Gene ontology
Molecular function	transferase activity; nucleotide binding; glycerol kinase activity; ATP binding; phosphotransferase activity, alcohol group as acceptor; kinase activity
Cellular component	cytoplasm; mitochondrial outer membrane; mitochondrion; membrane
Biological process	glycerol-3-phosphate biosynthetic process; glycerol-3-phosphate metabolic process; triglyceride metabolic process; glycerol metabolic process; phosphorylation; glycerol catabolic process; carbohydrate metabolic process
Sources:Amigo / QuickGO
Orthologs
Databases	NCBI: entry; OMA: entry
Species	Human	Mouse
Entrez	2713	n/a
Ensembl	ENSG00000229894	n/a
UniProt	Q14409	n/a
RefSeq (mRNA)	NM_001395953	n/a
RefSeq (protein)	n/a	n/a
Location (UCSC)	Chr 4: 165.28 – 165.28 Mb	n/a
PubMed search		n/a
- Wikidata
View/Edit Human

Glycerol kinase 3 is an enzyme that in humans is encoded by the GK3 gene (previously GK3P). This enzyme functions as a glycerol kinase and is primarily expressed in the testis. The gene GK3, like GK2, lacks introns, and is thought to have come from the gene GK through a reverse transcriptase event. Not much has been reported about the function of Glycerol kinase 3, but it may be involved in glycerol uptake and metabolism.
