= Voltage-dependent anion channel =

Class of porin ion channels in the outer mitochondrial membrane

Eukaryotic porin
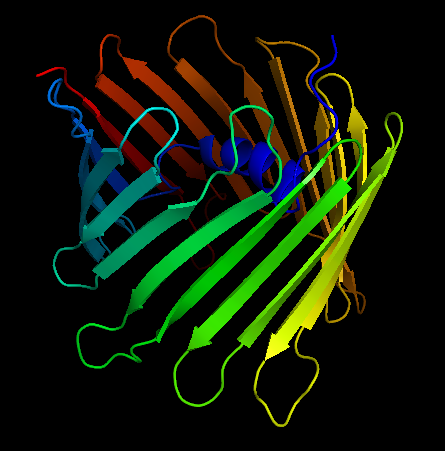
- Crystal Structure of the Human Voltage-Dependent Anion Channel. The arrows denote the antiparallel beta sheets that form the characteristic beta-barrel

Identifiers
- Symbol: Porin_3
- Pfam: PF01459
- InterPro: IPR001925
- PROSITE: PDOC00483
- TCDB: 1.B.8
- OPM superfamily: 189
- OPM protein: 3emn
- CDD: cd07306
Available protein structures:
- PDB: IPR001925 PF01459 (ECOD; PDBsum)
- AlphaFold: IPR001925; PF01459

Voltage-dependent anion channels, or mitochondrial porins, are a class of porin ion channel located on the outer mitochondrial membrane. There is debate as to whether or not this channel is expressed in the cell surface membrane.

This major protein of the outer mitochondrial membrane of eukaryotes forms a voltage-dependent anion-selective channel (VDAC) that behaves as a general diffusion pore for small hydrophilic molecules. The channel adopts an open conformation at low or zero membrane potential and a closed conformation at potentials above 30–40 mV. VDAC facilitates the exchange of ions and molecules between mitochondria and cytosol and is regulated by the interactions with other proteins and small molecules.

== Structure ==
This protein contains about 280 amino acids and forms a beta barrel which spans the mitochondrial outer membrane.

Since its discovery in 1976, extensive function and structure analysis of VDAC proteins has been conducted. A prominent feature of the pore emerged: when reconstituted into planar lipid bilayers, there is a voltage-dependent switch between an anion-selective high-conductance state with high metabolite flux and a cation-selective low-conductance state with limited passage of metabolites.

More than 30 years after its initial discovery, in 2008, three independent structural projects of VDAC-1 were completed. The first was solved by multi-dimensional NMR spectroscopy. The second applied a hybrid approach using crystallographic data. The third was for mouse VDAC-1 crystals determined by X-ray crystallographic techniques. The three projects of the 3D structures of VDAC-1 revealed many structural features. First, VDAC-1 represents a new structural class of outer membrane β-barrel proteins with an odd number of strands. Another aspect is that the negatively charged side chain of residue E73 is oriented towards the hydrophobic membrane environment. The 19-stranded 3D structure obtained under different experimental sources by three different laboratories fits the EM and AFM data from native membrane sources and represents a biologically relevant state of VDAC-1.

== Mechanism ==
At membrane potentials exceeding 30 mV (positive or negative), VDAC assumes a closed state, and transitions to its open state once the voltage drops below this threshold. Although both states allow passage of simple salts, VDAC is much more stringent with organic anions, a category into which most metabolites fall. The precise mechanism for coupling voltage changes to conformational changes within the protein has not yet been worked out, but studies by Thomas et al. suggest that when the protein transitions to the closed form, voltage changes lead to the removal of a large section of the protein from the channel and decrease effective pore radius. Several lysine residues, as well as Glu-152, have been implicated as especially important sensor residues within the protein.

== Biological function ==
The voltage-dependent ion channel plays a key role in regulating metabolic and energetic flux across the outer mitochondrial membrane. It is involved in the transport of ATP, ADP, pyruvate, malate, and other metabolites, and thus communicates extensively with enzymes from metabolic pathways. The ATP-dependent cytosolic enzymes hexokinase, glucokinase, and glycerol kinase, as well as the mitochondrial enzyme creatine kinase, have all been found to bind to VDAC. This binding puts them in close proximity to ATP released from the mitochondria. In particular, the binding of hexokinase is presumed to play a key role in coupling glycolysis to oxidative phosphorylation. Additionally, VDAC is an important regulator of Ca^{2+} transport in and out of the mitochondria. Because Ca^{2+} is a cofactor for metabolic enzymes such as pyruvate dehydrogenase and isocitrate dehydrogenase, energetic production and homeostasis are both affected by VDAC's permeability to Ca^{2+}.

== Disease relevance ==
VDAC has also been shown to play a role in apoptosis. During apoptosis, VDAC modifies the mitochondrial permeability transition pore to release of apoptogenic factors such as cytochrome c. However, VDAC are not essential components of the mitochondrial permeability transition pore. Although cytochrome c plays an essential role in oxidative phosphorylation within the mitochondrion, in the cytosol it activates proteolytic enzymes called caspases, which play a major role in cell death. Although the mechanism for VDAC-facilitated cytochrome c release has not yet been fully elucidated, some research suggests that oligomerization between individual subunits may create a large flexible pore through which cytochrome c can pass. A more important factor is that release of cytochrome c is also regulated by the Bcl-2 protein family: Bax interacts directly with VDAC to increase pore size and promote cytochrome c release, while anti-apoptotic Bcl-xL produces the exact opposite effect. In fact, it has been shown that antibodies that inhibit VDAC also interfere with Bax-mediated cytochrome c release in both isolated mitochondria and whole cells. This key role in apoptosis suggests VDAC as a potential target for chemotherapeutic drugs.

== Examples ==
Yeast contains two members of this family (genes POR1 and POR2); vertebrates have at least three members (genes VDAC1, VDAC2 and VDAC3).

Humans, like most higher eukaryotes, encode three different VDACs; VDAC1, VDAC2, and VDAC3. Together with TOMM40 and TOMM40L they represent a family of evolutionarily related β-barrels.

Plants have the largest number of VDACs. Arabidopsis encode four different VDACs but this number can be larger in other species.
