= DYNLT3 =

Protein-coding gene in humans

Identifiers
- Aliases: DYNLT3, RP3, TCTE1L, TCTEX1L, dynein light chain Tctex-type 3
- External IDs: OMIM: 300302; MGI: 1914367; GeneCards: DYNLT3

Gene location (Human)
Chr.	X chromosome (human)
Band	Xp11.4	Start	37,836,757 bp
Band	Xp11.4	End	37,847,571 bp

Gene location (Mouse)
Chr.	X chromosome (mouse)
Band	X|X A1.1	Start	9,520,506 bp
Band	X|X A1.1	End	9,529,242 bp
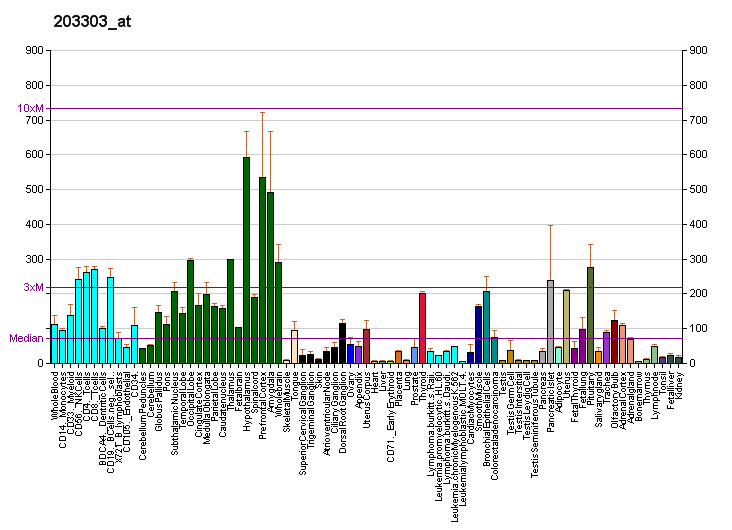
RNA expression pattern
Bgee	Human / Mouse (ortholog); Top expressed in: gums; gingival epithelium; pons; dorsal motor nucleus of vagus nerve; pars compacta; Brodmann area 23; lateral nuclear group of thalamus; optic nerve; oral cavity; glomerulus / Top expressed in: Epithelium of choroid plexus; transitional epithelium of urinary bladder; seminal vesicula; deep cerebellar nuclei; medial vestibular nucleus; retinal pigment epithelium; lateral geniculate nucleus; epithelium of lens; conjunctival fornix; facial motor nucleus; More reference expression data
BioGPS	More reference expression data
Gene ontology
Molecular function	cytoskeletal motor activity; protein binding; identical protein binding
Cellular component	cytoplasm; kinetochore; chromosome; dynein complex; cytoplasmic dynein complex; microtubule; chromosome, centromeric region; cytoskeleton; nucleus; mitotic spindle astral microtubule
Biological process	cell cycle; regulation of mitotic cell cycle; cell division; positive regulation of mitotic cell cycle
Sources:Amigo / QuickGO
Orthologs
Databases	NCBI: entry; OMA: entry
Species	Human	Mouse
Entrez	6990	67117
Ensembl	ENSG00000165169	ENSMUSG00000031176
UniProt	P51808	P56387
RefSeq (mRNA)	NM_006520	NM_025975
RefSeq (protein)	NP_006511	NP_080251
Location (UCSC)	Chr X: 37.84 – 37.85 Mb	Chr X: 9.52 – 9.53 Mb
PubMed search
- Wikidata
View/Edit Human	View/Edit Mouse

Dynein, light chain, Tctex-type 3, also known as DYNLT3, is a protein which in humans is encoded by the DYNLT3 gene.

== Function ==
DYNLT3 is a member of the dynein motor protein family. DYNLT3 binds to BUB3, a spindle checkpoint protein is present on kinetochores at prometaphase. DYNLT3 can also function as a transcription regulator of Bcl-2 gene through binding to SATB1 in a dynein-independent manner.

== Interactions ==
DYNLT3 has been shown to interact with VDAC1.
