= Glycerol kinase 2 =

Enzyme found in humans

GK2

Identifiers
- Aliases: GK2, GKP2, GKTA, glycerol kinase 2
- External IDs: MGI: 1329027; GeneCards: GK2
Enzyme activity
EC #	BRENDA	ExPASy	KEGG	MetaCyc
2.7.1.30	↗	↗	↗	↗

Gene location (Human)
Chr.	Chromosome 4 (human)
Band	4q21.21	Start	79,406,361 bp
Band	4q21.21	End	79,408,228 bp

Gene location (Mouse)
Chr.	Chromosome 5 (mouse)
Band	5 E3|5 47.71 cM	Start	97,603,001 bp
Band	5 E3|5 47.71 cM	End	97,604,880 bp
RNA expression pattern
Bgee	Human / Mouse (ortholog); Top expressed in: sperm; left testis; right testis; pancreatic ductal cell; gonad; right coronary artery; human musculoskeletal system; muscular system; muscle; muscle / Top expressed in: spermatid; seminiferous tubule; spermatocyte; blastocyst; uterus; islet of Langerhans; medial head of gastrocnemius muscle; liver; adrenal gland; More reference expression data
BioGPS	n/a
Gene ontology
Molecular function	transferase activity; nucleotide binding; glycerol kinase activity; ATP binding; phosphotransferase activity, alcohol group as acceptor; kinase activity
Cellular component	cytoplasm; mitochondrial outer membrane; extracellular exosome; mitochondrion; membrane
Biological process	glycerol-3-phosphate biosynthetic process; glycerol-3-phosphate metabolic process; triglyceride metabolic process; glycerol metabolic process; phosphorylation; glycerol catabolic process; carbohydrate metabolic process
Sources:Amigo / QuickGO
Orthologs
Databases	NCBI: entry; OMA: entry
Species	Human	Mouse
Entrez	2712	14626
Ensembl	ENSG00000196475	ENSMUSG00000050553
UniProt	Q14410	Q9WU65
RefSeq (mRNA)	NM_033214	NM_010294
RefSeq (protein)	NP_149991	NP_034424
Location (UCSC)	Chr 4: 79.41 – 79.41 Mb	Chr 5: 97.6 – 97.6 Mb
PubMed search
- Wikidata
View/Edit Human	View/Edit Mouse

Glycerol kinase 2 is an enzyme that in humans is encoded by the GK2 gene (previously GKP2). This type of glycerol kinase is mainly found in the testis, where it is involved in arranging the crescent shaped mitochondria to form a sheaf during the spermatogenesis (sperm production). Mitochondrial clustering is induced through interaction with the enyzme PLD6 which increases the mitochondrial production of phosphatidic acid. GK2 knock-out in mice results in male infertility due to mitochondrial dysfunction and defective sperm tails in spermatozoa.

== Evolution ==
GK2 and the similar gene GK3 both lack of introns, and are thought to have arisen from the gene GK through a reverse transcriptase event. GK2 and GK3 both encode glycerol kinases that are primarily expressed in the testis.
