= Buthionine sulfoximine =

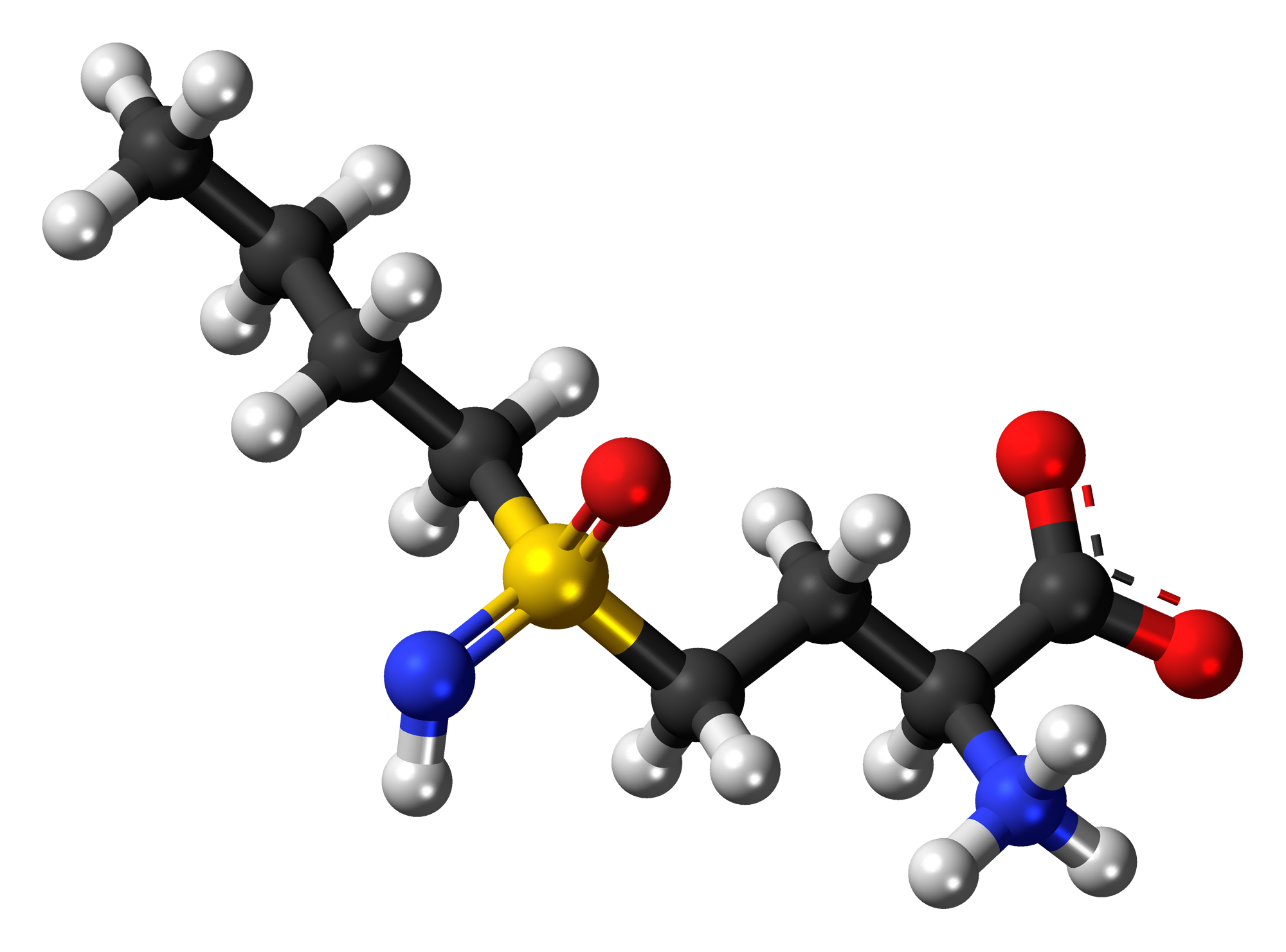

Names
- IUPAC name 2-amino-4-(butylsulfonimidoyl)butanoic acid
- Other names BSO

Identifiers
CAS Number	5072-26-4
3D model (JSmol)	Interactive image
ChEBI	CHEBI:28714
ChemSpider	19896
ECHA InfoCard	100.156.351
MeSH	Buthionine+sulfoximine
PubChem CID	21157
UNII	LW4108Q0BV
CompTox Dashboard (EPA)	DTXSID6044434
- InChI: InChI=1S/C8H18N2O3S/c1-2-3-5-14(10,13)6-4-7(9)8(11)12/h7,10H,2-6,9H2,1H3,(H,11,12) Key: KJQFBVYMGADDTQ-UHFFFAOYSA-N; InChI=1/C8H18N2O3S/c1-2-3-5-14(10,13)6-4-7(9)8(11)12/h7,10H,2-6,9H2,1H3,(H,11,12) Key: KJQFBVYMGADDTQ-UHFFFAOYAW
- SMILES: CCCCS(=N)(=O)CCC(C(=O)O)N

Properties
Chemical formula	C_{8}H_{18}N_{2}O_{3}S
Molar mass	222.305 g/mol
Density	1.29 g/mL
Melting point	215 °C (419 °F; 488 K)
Boiling point	382.3 °C (720.1 °F; 655.5 K)
- Except where otherwise noted, data are given for materials in their standard state (at 25 °C [77 °F], 100 kPa). verify (what is ?) Infobox references

Buthionine sulfoximine (BSO) is a sulfoximine derivative which reduces levels of glutathione and is being investigated as an adjunct with chemotherapy in the treatment of cancer. The compound inhibits gamma-glutamylcysteine synthetase, the enzyme required in the first step of glutathione synthesis. Buthionine sulfoximine may also be used to increase the sensitivity of parasites to oxidative antiparasitic drugs.
