= Dual specificity protein kinase TTK =

Protein-coding gene in the species Homo sapiens

TTK
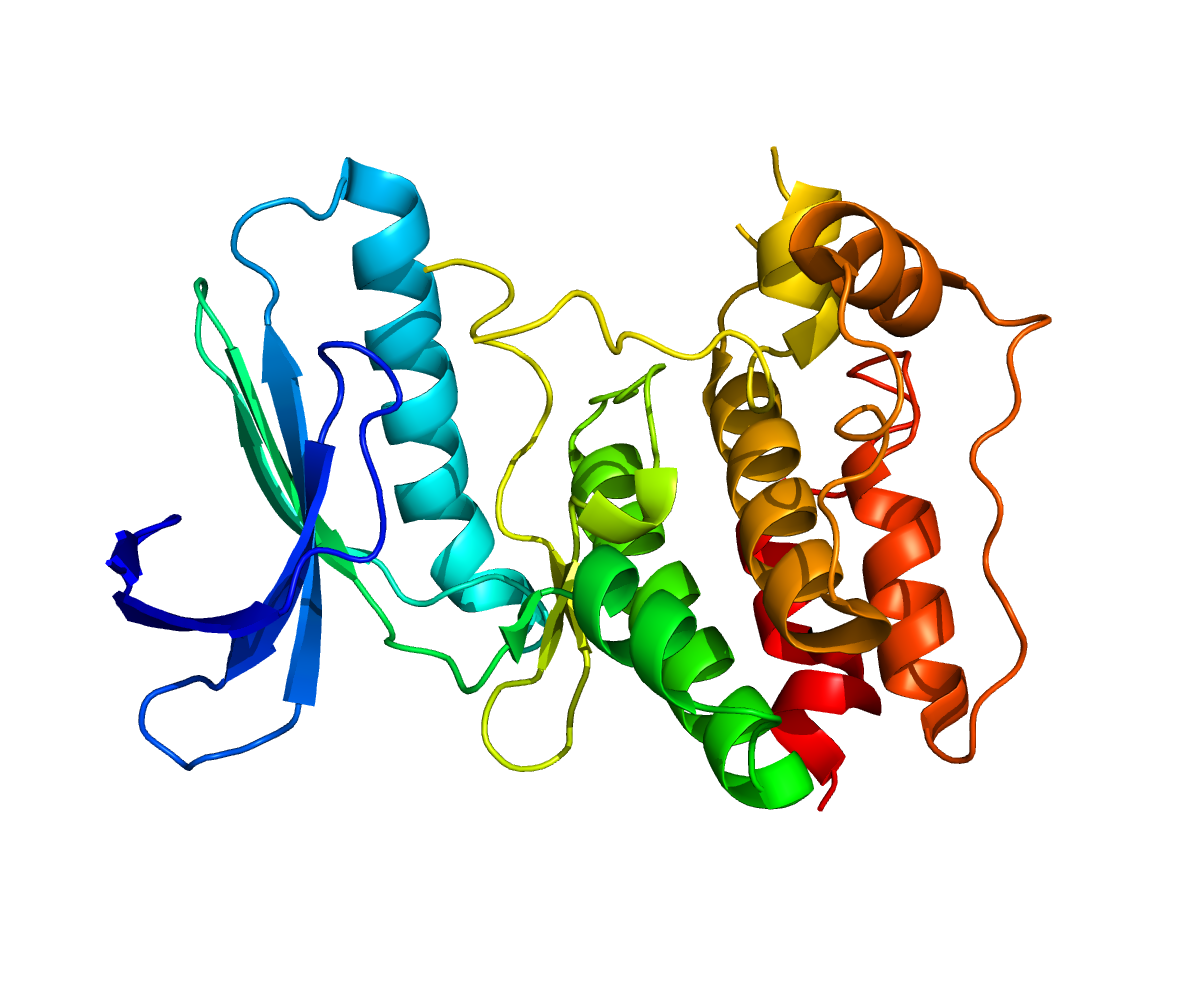

Identifiers
- Aliases: TTK, CT96, ESK, MPH1, MPS1, MPS1L1, PYT, TTK protein kinase
- External IDs: OMIM: 604092; MGI: 1194921; GeneCards: TTK
Available structures
PDB	Ortholog search: PDBe RCSB
PDB	List of PDB id codes 2X9E, 2ZMC, 2ZMD, 3CEK, 3DBQ, 3GFW, 3H9F, 3HMN, 3HMO, 3HMP, 3VQU, 3W1F, 3WYX, 3WYY, 3WZJ, 3WZK, 4B94, 4BHZ, 4BI0, 4BI1, 4BI2, 4C4E, 4C4G, 4C4H, 4C4I, 4C4J, 4CV8, 4CV9, 4CVA, 4D2S, 4H7X, 4H7Y, 4JS8, 4JT3, 4O6L, 5AP0, 5AP1, 5AP2, 5AP3, 5AP4, 5AP5, 5AP6, 5AP7, 5EI2, 5EHY, 5EH0, 5EI6, 4ZEG, 5EI8
Enzyme activity
EC #	BRENDA	ExPASy	KEGG	MetaCyc
2.7.12.1	↗	↗	↗	↗

Gene location (Human)
Chr.	Chromosome 6 (human)
Band	6q14.1	Start	80,003,887 bp
Band	6q14.1	End	80,042,527 bp

Gene location (Mouse)
Chr.	Chromosome 9 (mouse)
Band	9|9 E2	Start	83,716,742 bp
Band	9|9 E2	End	83,754,442 bp
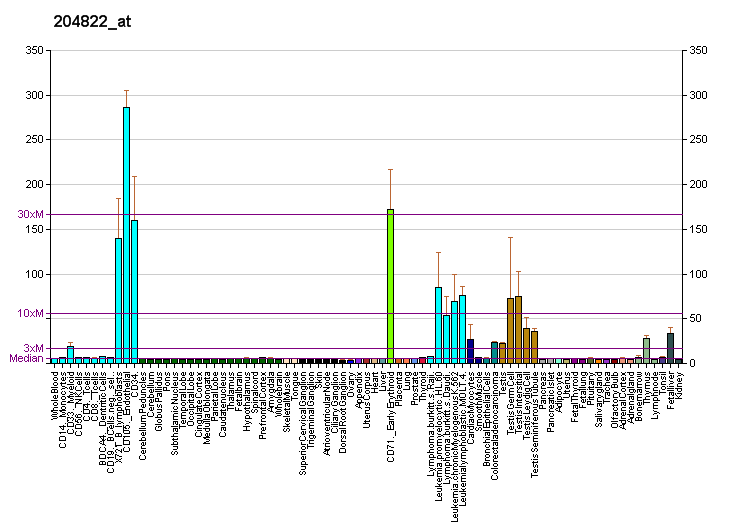
RNA expression pattern
Bgee	Human / Mouse (ortholog); Top expressed in: secondary oocyte; ventricular zone; gonad; testicle; ganglionic eminence; sperm; trabecular bone; right testis; left testis; bone marrow / Top expressed in: zygote; primary oocyte; genital tubercle; tail of embryo; maxillary prominence; secondary oocyte; mandibular prominence; epiblast; spermatocyte; spermatid; More reference expression data
BioGPS	More reference expression data
Gene ontology
Molecular function	kinase activity; transferase activity; protein serine/threonine/tyrosine kinase activity; protein serine/threonine kinase activity; protein tyrosine kinase activity; nucleotide binding; protein kinase activity; protein binding; ATP binding; protein homodimerization activity; kinetochore binding
Cellular component	spindle; membrane; cytoplasm; kinetochore; nucleus
Biological process	chromosome separation; mitotic spindle organization; positive regulation of pathway-restricted SMAD protein phosphorylation; spindle organization; mitotic spindle assembly checkpoint signaling; positive regulation of cell population proliferation; protein phosphorylation; phosphorylation; mitotic cell cycle checkpoint signaling; peptidyl-tyrosine phosphorylation; female meiosis chromosome segregation; peptidyl-serine phosphorylation; peptidyl-threonine phosphorylation; meiotic spindle assembly checkpoint signaling; protein localization to kinetochore; protein localization to chromosome; protein autophosphorylation; protein localization to meiotic spindle midzone; chromosome segregation
Sources:Amigo / QuickGO
Orthologs
Databases	NCBI: entry; OMA: entry
Species	Human	Mouse
Entrez	7272	22137
Ensembl	ENSG00000112742	ENSMUSG00000038379
UniProt	P33981	P35761
RefSeq (mRNA)	NM_001166691; NM_003318	NM_001110265; NM_001284272; NM_009445
RefSeq (protein)	NP_001160163; NP_003309	NP_001103735; NP_001271201; NP_033471
Location (UCSC)	Chr 6: 80 – 80.04 Mb	Chr 9: 83.72 – 83.75 Mb
PubMed search
- Wikidata
View/Edit Human	View/Edit Mouse

Dual specificity protein kinase TTK also known as Mps1 is an enzyme that in humans is encoded by the TTK gene.
