= Cystine/glutamate transporter =

Protein found in humans

SLC7A11

Identifiers
- Aliases: SLC7A11, CCBR1, xCT, solute carrier family 7 member 11
- External IDs: OMIM: 607933; MGI: 1347355; GeneCards: SLC7A11

Gene location (Human)
| Chr. | Chromosome 4 (human) |
| Band | 4q28.3 | Start | 138,164,097 bp |
| Band | 4q28.3 | End | 138,242,349 bp |

Gene location (Mouse)
| Chr. | Chromosome 3 (mouse) |
| Band | 3 C|3 21.72 cM | Start | 49,846,975 bp |
| Band | 3 C|3 21.72 cM | End | 50,398,063 bp |
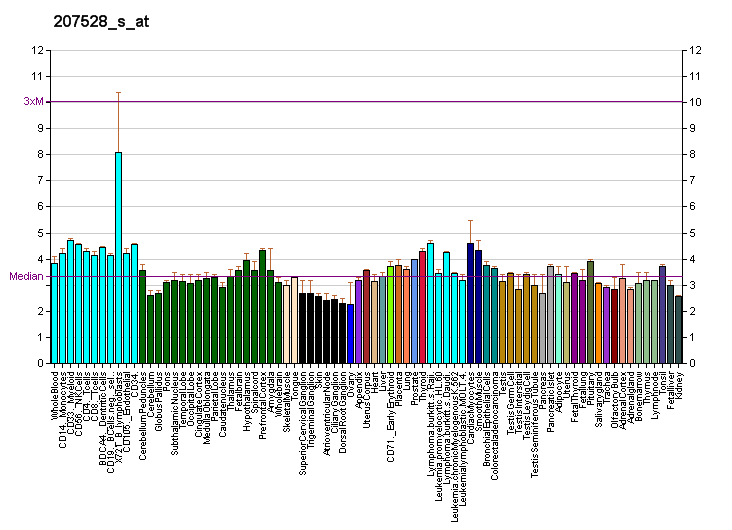

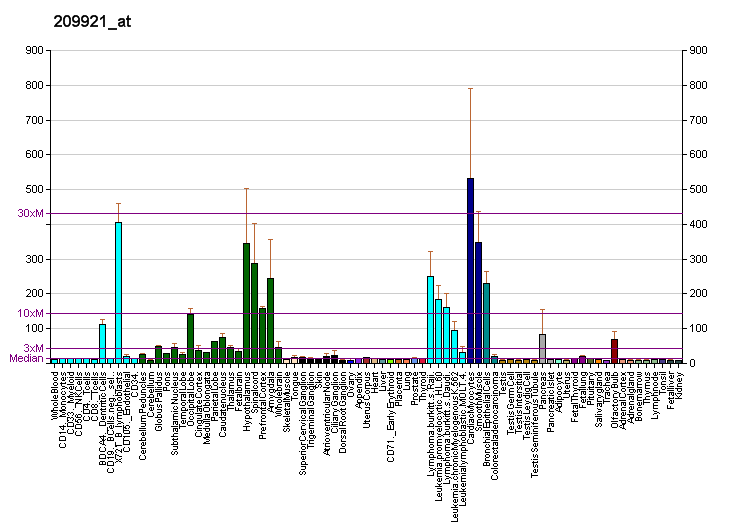

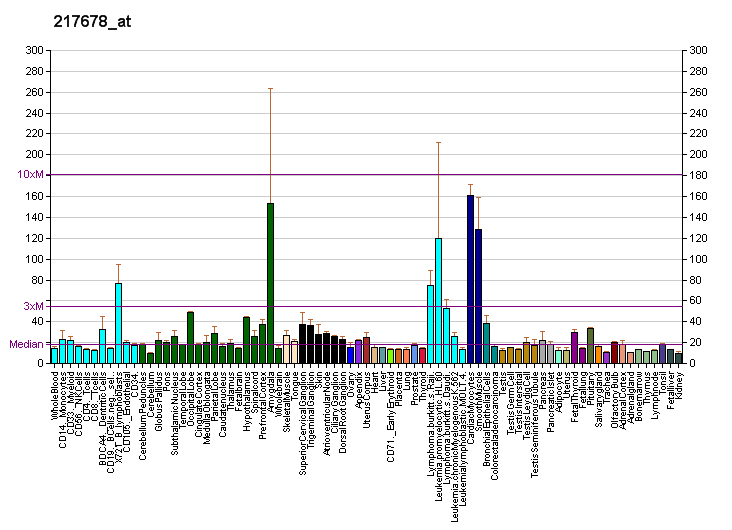
RNA expression pattern
| Bgee | Human / Mouse (ortholog); Top expressed in: optic nerve; stromal cell of endometrium; external globus pallidus; internal globus pallidus; entorhinal cortex; cartilage tissue; endothelial cell; medulla oblongata; gingival epithelium; superior vestibular nucleus / Top expressed in: secondary oocyte; primary oocyte; granulocyte; zygote; choroidal fissure; lumbar subsegment of spinal cord; dentate gyrus of hippocampal formation granule cell; epithelium of lens; endothelial cell of lymphatic vessel; thymus; More reference expression data |
| BioGPS | More reference expression data |
Gene ontology
| Molecular function | cystine:glutamate antiporter activity; protein binding; transmembrane transporter activity; L-amino acid transmembrane transporter activity |
| Cellular component | integral component of membrane; rough endoplasmic reticulum; membrane; intracellular membrane-bounded organelle; plasma membrane; cell surface; cytoskeleton; integral component of plasma membrane; brush border membrane; astrocyte projection |
| Biological process | response to nicotine; response to oxidative stress; brain development; lens fiber cell differentiation; platelet aggregation; amino acid transport; response to toxic substance; leukocyte migration; transmembrane transport; L-glutamate transmembrane transport; glutathione metabolic process; visual learning; response to organic cyclic compound; ventricular system development; striatum development; adult behavior; regulation of neutrophil apoptotic process; cellular response to oxidative stress; glutathione transmembrane transport; regulation of cell population proliferation; regulation of melanin biosynthetic process; lung alveolus development; modulation of chemical synaptic transmission; regulation of synapse organization; regulation of protein transport; response to redox state; limb development; organic substance transport; glutamate homeostasis; L-glutamate import across plasma membrane; dipeptide import across plasma membrane; regulation of cellular response to oxidative stress; regulation of cysteine metabolic process; negative regulation of oxidative stress-induced neuron death; regulation of glutathione biosynthetic process; regulation of AMPA glutamate receptor clustering; regulation of glutamate metabolic process |
Sources:Amigo / QuickGO
Orthologs
| Databases | NCBI: entry; OMA: entry |
| Species | Human | Mouse |
| Entrez | 23657 | 26570 |
| Ensembl | ENSG00000151012 | ENSMUSG00000027737 |
| UniProt | Q9UPY5 | Q9WTR6 |
| RefSeq (mRNA) | NM_014331 | NM_011990 |
| RefSeq (protein) | NP_055146 | NP_036120 |
| Location (UCSC) | Chr 4: 138.16 – 138.24 Mb | Chr 3: 49.85 – 50.4 Mb |
| PubMed search |
- Wikidata
| View/Edit Human | View/Edit Mouse |

Cystine/glutamate transporter is an antiporter that in humans is encoded by the SLC7A11 gene.

The SLC7A11 gene encodes a sodium-independent cystine-glutamate antiporter that is chloride dependent, also known as xCT. Along with a heavy chain subunit from SLC3A2, the SLC7A11 light chain comprises system Xc-, which is the functional cystine-glutamate antiporter. While the SLC3A2 heavy chain is a chaperone for many other light chains that participate in amino acid transport, the SLC7A11 light chain is specific for system Xc-, and the terms xCT/SLC7A11 and system Xc- are used interchangeably in much of the literature.

SLC7A11 couples the uptake of one molecule of cystine with the release of one molecule of glutamate, and therefore it plays an important role in glutathione production throughout nervous and non-nervous tissues. In the nervous system, SLC7A11 regulates synaptic activity by stimulating extrasynaptic receptors and performs nonvesicular glutamate release. This gene is highly expressed by astrocytes. The expression of Xc- was detected throughout the brain with higher expression found in the basolateral amygdala, the retina and the prefrontal cortex. The inhibition of system Xc- has been found to alter a number of behaviors, which suggests that it plays a key role in excitatory signaling. SLC7A11 has been found to accept cysteine hydropersulfide as an alternative substrate, exchanging one molecule of cysteine hydropersulfide for one molecule of cystine under the basal concentration gradients for these species.

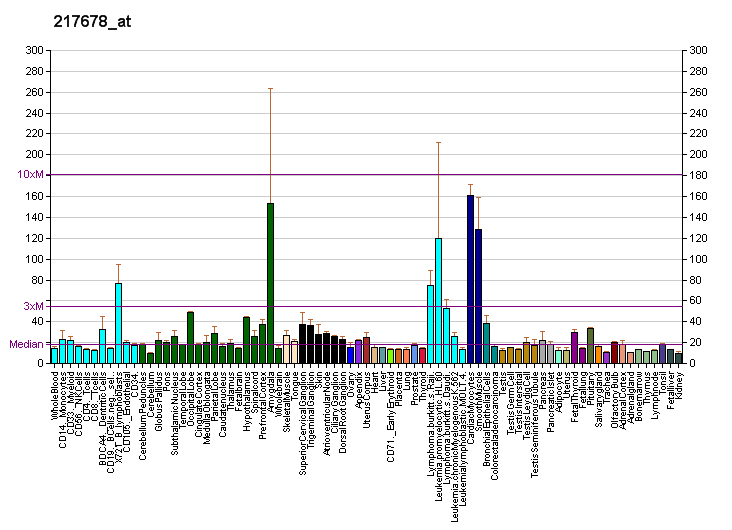
Expression pattern of SLC7A11

Diagram of a synapse

== Structure ==
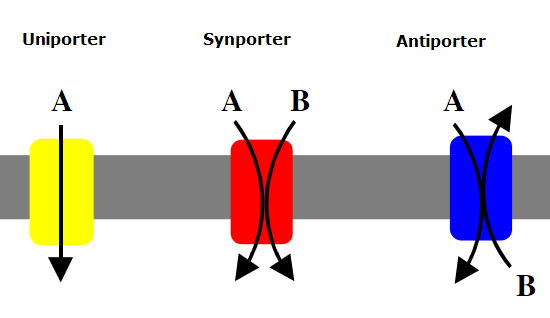
There are three different types of transporters including: uniporter, synporter, and anti porter. The anti-porter allows for two different substances to move in opposite directions at a one-to-one counter transport.

SLC7A11 is a member of a heterodimeric Na+-independent anionic amino acid transport system highly specific for cystine and glutamate. This antiporter imports cystine and exports glutamate, which are both amino acids. An antiporter functions with a one-to-one counter-transport, which is when one substance is transported across the membrane at the same time another substance is transported across the membrane in the opposite direction. The antiporter is a heterodimeric amino acid transporter, requiring both the SLC7A11 light chain and SLC3A2 heavy chain linked by a disulfide bridge. The SLC7A11 light chain has 12 transmembrane domains consisting of 501 amino acids, and the SLC3A2 heavy chain appears to be highly conserved among transporters. The human SLC7A11 has an 89% similarity of amino acids to the homologous mouse xCT protein. The complementary DNA, cDNA, has a total of 9648 base pairs. The SLC7A11 gene has been found not only in the brain, but has also been found to be expressed in the spinal cord, pancreas, and in glioma cells.

== Regulation ==
There are many mechanisms that exist to regulate the expression of system Xc-, although it is not the sole determinant of extracellular glutamate or intracellular glutathione. An example is amino acid deprivation, which triggers up regulation of the transporter. A key regulator is extracellular glutamate; when it becomes excessive, it goes from an excitatory transmitter to an excitotoxin. The inhibition of uptake of extracellular cystine into cells leads to decreased levels of intracellular glutathione which leads to ferroptosis. This regulation may be done through Excitatory Amino Acid Transporters (EAATs), which decrease extracellular glutamate and increase intracellular glutamate in astrocytes. When looking at its structure, xCT seems to be the main determinant for the system's activity. Glutamate and cystine can be transported in both directions, but, generally, more cystine is imported and more glutamate is exported. Extracellular glutamate acts as a competitive inhibitor for cystine uptake via system Xc-.

=== Glutamate ===
Monosodium glutamate

There is a high amount of glutamate in mammalian cells. Glutamate is necessary for excitatory signaling between neurons. The release must be highly organized, due to the large amounts of glutamate at the synaptic cleft, and the fact that it is released at high speeds. This mechanism of release at the synaptic cleft is partially controlled through the active transport of glutamate out of astrocytes by system Xc-. This release also has a physiological role in the regulation of glutamatergic metabotropic receptors and control of other neurotransmitters.

It has been demonstrated that, in the embryonic retina, Xc- exchanger is responsible for 50% of total glutamate uptake, representing a Sodium-Independent system within this tissue. The high activity of Xc- in the retina is correlated to a neuroprotective role, once it can take up excessive extracellular glutamate and provide precursors for the synthesis of Glutathione.

=== Cystine ===
Cystine is a dimer consisting of two cysteine molecules and the formation of a disulfide bond. This amino acid is a rate limiting substrate used in the SLC7A11 cystine/glutamate transporter and is usually imported into the cell. Cysteine-158 is specifically used in the formation of the disulfide bridge for the protein structure of system Xc-. There are neurotoxins, such as BMAA, that can prevent the intake of cystine, which can lead to decreased extracellular glutamate levels and an increase in oxidative stress.

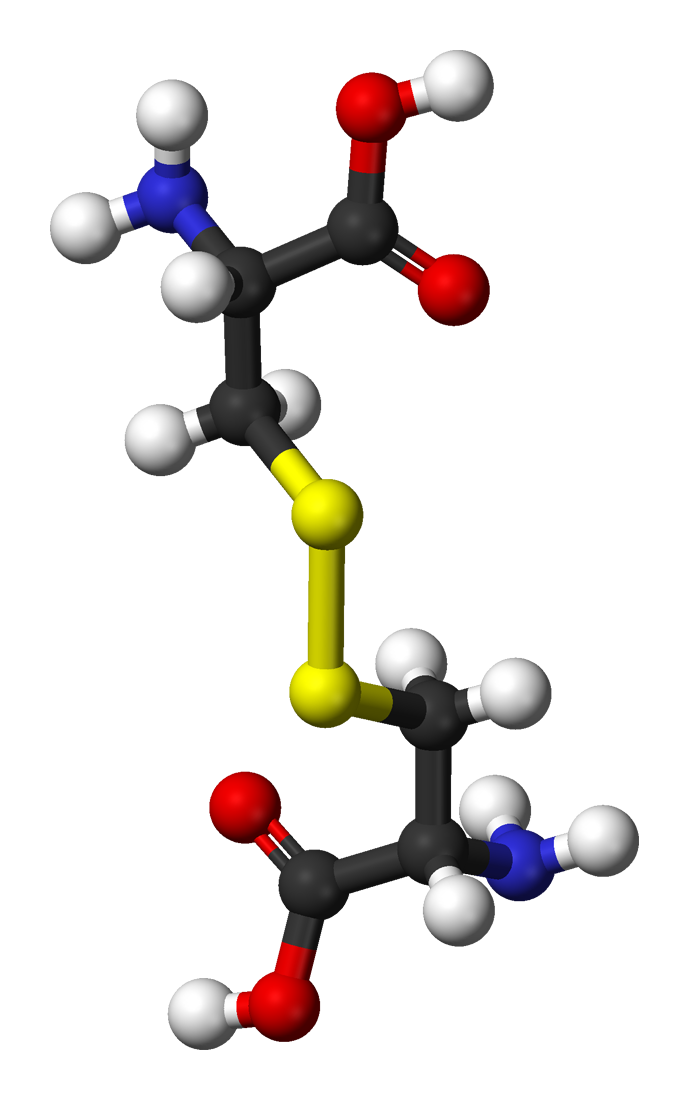
3-dimensional cystine structure

=== Pharmacological inhibition ===
System Xc- can be inhibited by many small molecules. Excess amounts of the endogenous substrate glutamate inhibits the function of system Xc-. Synthetic small molecules such as erastin, sulfasalazine, and sorafenib can inhibit system Xc- function and induce ferroptosis.

== Clinical relevancy ==
Many central nervous system (CNS) disorders are due to a dysfunction in glutamate signaling. Glutamate is transported via EAATs and system Xc-. If either of these transporters are impaired, it could result in a disruption in glutamate homeostasis and lead to a variety of CNS disorders

=== Drug addiction ===
It has been found that cocaine produces a decrease in Cystine-Glutamate exchange via system Xc-, leading to a decrease in basal, extra synaptic glutamate levels in the nucleus accumbens core (NAcc) region of the brains of cocaine-withdrawn rats. It has also been observed in withdrawn rats that a decrease in Group 2 mGluR inhibition of vesicular release, most likely due to the decrease in extrasynaptic glutamate levels, leads to an increase in cocaine-evoked glutamate signaling in their NAcc. An infusion of cysteine in the NAcc of withdrawn rats leads to an increase in extrasynaptic glutamate, near the levels of the control rats, and prevents an increase in synaptic glutamate signaling after a cocaine injection. These findings suggest there is a decrease in system Xc- activity in cocaine-withdrawn rats. It has also been found that cocaine increases glutamate signaling in the synaptic cleft, further supporting this conclusion.

Administration of the cysteine prodrugs N-acetylcysteine or L-2-oxothiazolidine-4-carboxylate blocks cocaine reinstatement in rats. N-acetylcysteine has been shown to decrease drug-seeking behavior for nicotine and heroin as well. However, N-acetylcysteine does not alter the cocaine-induced rush or euphoria; it only causes a reduction in drug-seeking behavior. N-acetylcysteine works by increasing levels of cysteine in cells, leading to an increase in system Xc- activity. This increase in system Xc- activity leads to an increase in extrasynaptic glutamate, causing stimulation of Group 2 mGluRs and an inhibition of synaptic release of glutamate. Cysteine prodrugs also lead to an increase in antioxidant properties by increasing levels of glutathione. Increased levels of glutathione lead to a lower toxicity of methamphetamine and alcohol, and cause a decrease in tumor formation after chronic smoking. N-acetylcysteine has been shown to decrease cravings and use of cocaine and tobacco, as well as other compulsive behaviors such as gambling and trichotillomania.

Repeated administration of cocaine causes disruptions in glutamate homeostasis that lead to a decrease in function of EAATs. It is also possible that glutamate is diffusing from surrounding synapses and is stimulating extrasynaptic receptors. All of these factors may be leading to the disruptions in glutamate signaling that are associated with drug addiction.

=== Schizophrenia ===
It has been proposed that schizophrenia may be due to an increase or a decrease in glutamate signaling, leading to abnormal excitatory signaling in the prefrontal cortex region of the brain. Glutamate release by astrocytes has been linked to the synchrony of neurons in the hippocampus and cortex. A decrease in system Xc- activity may result in an increase in synaptic glutamate and a decrease in extrasynaptic glutamate. Administration of N-acetylcysteine leads to an increase in extrasynaptic NMDA receptor activation, suggesting that glutamate released from system Xc- may cause the activation of extrasynaptic NMDA receptors. A decrease in system Xc- activity may cause a decrease in the activation of extrasynaptic NMDA receptors due to either a decrease in extrasynaptic Glutamate levels or a decrease in glutathione levels after the decrease in cystine transport. On the other hand, a decrease in system Xc- activity may lead to an increase in the activation of synaptic NMDA receptors due to the decrease in activation of Group 2 mGluRs. A decrease in nonvesicular release of glutamate leads to an increase in expression of postsynaptic glutamate receptors, such as NMDA receptors. A disruption in nonvesicular glutamate release may affect synapse formation, lead to altered release of neurotransmitters, and could even disturb cortical migration during development. All of these seem to be associated with schizophrenia.

An increase in the expression of Group 2 mGluRs, which could arise from a chronic under stimulation of these receptors, has been associated with schizophrenia. An increase in levels of system Xc- has also been found in postmortem schizophrenia patients, indicating that there may have been a decrease in net function of these receptors as well, leading to greater expression. It has been observed that Schizophrenia patients have a decreased level of glutathione in their prefrontal cortex, further supporting the conclusion that system Xc- may not be functioning properly.

Clinical trials have shown therapeutic potential for N-acetylcysteine in treating schizophrenia. Again, changes in EAATs due to disruptions in Glutamate homeostasis may also be involved.

Recent study showed that mRNA expression levels of both SLC3A2 and SLC7A11 in WBCs of schizophrenia patients are lower than that of healthy individuals. The finding supports the hypo-glutamatergic neurotransmission hypothesis in schizophrenia.

=== Neurodegenerative disorders ===
The release of glutamate by system Xc- may lead to excitotoxicity, which is initiated by extrasynaptic NMDA receptors and can cause neuronal death. It has been observed that glutamate released from microglia leads to oligodendrocyte death in culture and in the rat optic nerve. However, an increase in system Xc- activity also has a protective effect by increasing levels of glutathione. Oxidative stress has been shown to lead to an increase in system Xc- expression, therefore there must be a balance between the positive protective effects of increased glutathione levels and the negative excitotoxicity effects of increased extrasynaptic glutamate levels.

==== Amyotrophic lateral sclerosis ====
It has been shown that amyotrophic lateral sclerosis (ALS) is clearly linked to changes in glutamate signaling and glutathione levels; there is also an astrocytic component linked to the disease. All of these factors suggest that a dysfunction in system Xc- may contribute to ALS. It has been observed that an increase in the expression of Nrf2, a transcription factor for system Xc-, leads to a protective effect in mice with ALS symptoms.

Alzheimer's disease-brain shrinkage

==== Alzheimer's disease ====
There is indirect evidence to suggest that system Xc- might be upregulated in Alzheimer's patients. It has been found in Alzheimer's patients that there is an increase in phosphorylation of the alpha subunit of eukaryotic initiation factor 2 and in expression of transcription factor 4, both of which increase system Xc- expression. It has also been shown that administration of N-acetylcysteine leads to a significant improvement in certain cognitive tasks for Alzheimer's patients.

==== Parkinson's disease ====
Parkinson's disease may be due to mitochondrial dysfunction or oxidative stress, both of which could be caused by a decrease in glutathione levels. Administration of N-acetylcysteine has been shown to counter age-related damage to mitochondria. The therapeutic effects of N-acetylcysteine in the treatment of Parkinson's disease has not been examined yet, though there is a clinical trial that is currently ongoing.

=== Neurotoxins ===
There is evidence that system Xc- may serve as an entry point for neurotoxins and viruses. β-N-methyl-L-alanine (BMAA) is an environmental neurotoxin that can act on system Xc- and inhibit cystine uptake. This leads to a decrease in glutathione levels and an increase in oxidative stress. BMAA can also be transported by system Xc- and lead to an increase in glutamate release and an increase in excitotoxicity. Therefore, BMAA prevents the positive effects of cystine uptake and creates the negative effects of increasing glutamate release.

==== Gliomas ====
A glioma is essentially a glial-derived tumor. These can be induced by an increase in glutamate levels due to an increase in system Xc- activity. Using inhibitors of system Xc- as a treatment for gliomas is currently under active investigation.

==== Peripheral cancers ====
system Xc- function also plays a role in non-neural cancers. Within the gastrointestinal tract, SLC7A11 is upregulated in esophageal, liver, gastric, colorectal, and pancreatic cancers, and inhibition of SLC7A11 has been shown to inhibit tumor progression, likely through induction of ferroptosis. Outside of the gastrointestinal tract, SLC7A11 expression is increased in prostate cancer, bladder cancer, non-small cell lung carcinoma, and melanoma. Inhibition of SLC7A11 in many of these cancers also shows promise in reducing tumor progression.
