= Glycerol kinase =

Enzyme found in humans

GK

Identifiers
- Aliases: GK, GK1, GKD, glycerol kinase
- External IDs: OMIM: 300474; MGI: 891990; GeneCards: GK
Enzyme activity
EC #	BRENDA	ExPASy	KEGG	MetaCyc
2.7.1.30	↗	↗	↗	↗

Gene location (Human)
Chr.	X chromosome (human)
Band	Xp21.2	Start	30,653,359 bp
Band	Xp21.2	End	30,731,462 bp

Gene location (Mouse)
Chr.	Chromosome 18 (mouse)
Band	18 D1|18 28.25 cM	Start	52,826,762 bp
Band	18 D1|18 28.25 cM	End	52,828,622 bp
RNA expression pattern
Bgee	Human / Mouse (ortholog); Top expressed in: jejunal mucosa; duodenum; kidney tubule; buccal mucosa cell; monocyte; right lobe of liver; blood; stromal cell of endometrium; human kidney; nasal epithelium / Top expressed in: spermatid; seminiferous tubule; spermatocyte; embryo; hair follicle; primary oocyte; dentate gyrus of hippocampal formation granule cell; islet of Langerhans; liver; More reference expression data
BioGPS	n/a
Gene ontology
Molecular function	transferase activity; nucleotide binding; phosphotransferase activity, alcohol group as acceptor; kinase activity; protein binding; ATP binding; glycerol kinase activity
Cellular component	cytoplasm; membrane; mitochondrial outer membrane; mitochondrion; extracellular exosome; cytosol
Biological process	phosphorylation; glycerol catabolic process; glycerol-3-phosphate metabolic process; glycerol-3-phosphate biosynthetic process; triglyceride biosynthetic process; triglyceride metabolic process; glycerol metabolic process; carbohydrate metabolic process
Sources:Amigo / QuickGO
Orthologs
Databases	NCBI: entry; OMA: entry
Species	Human	Mouse
Entrez	2710	14625
Ensembl	ENSG00000198814	ENSMUSG00000053624
UniProt	P32189	Q8C635
RefSeq (mRNA)	NM_000167; NM_001128127; NM_001205019; NM_203391; NM_001399987	NM_010293
RefSeq (protein)	NP_000158; NP_001121599; NP_001191948; NP_976325	NP_034423
Location (UCSC)	Chr X: 30.65 – 30.73 Mb	Chr 18: 52.83 – 52.83 Mb
PubMed search
- Wikidata
View/Edit Human	View/Edit Mouse

glycerol kinase
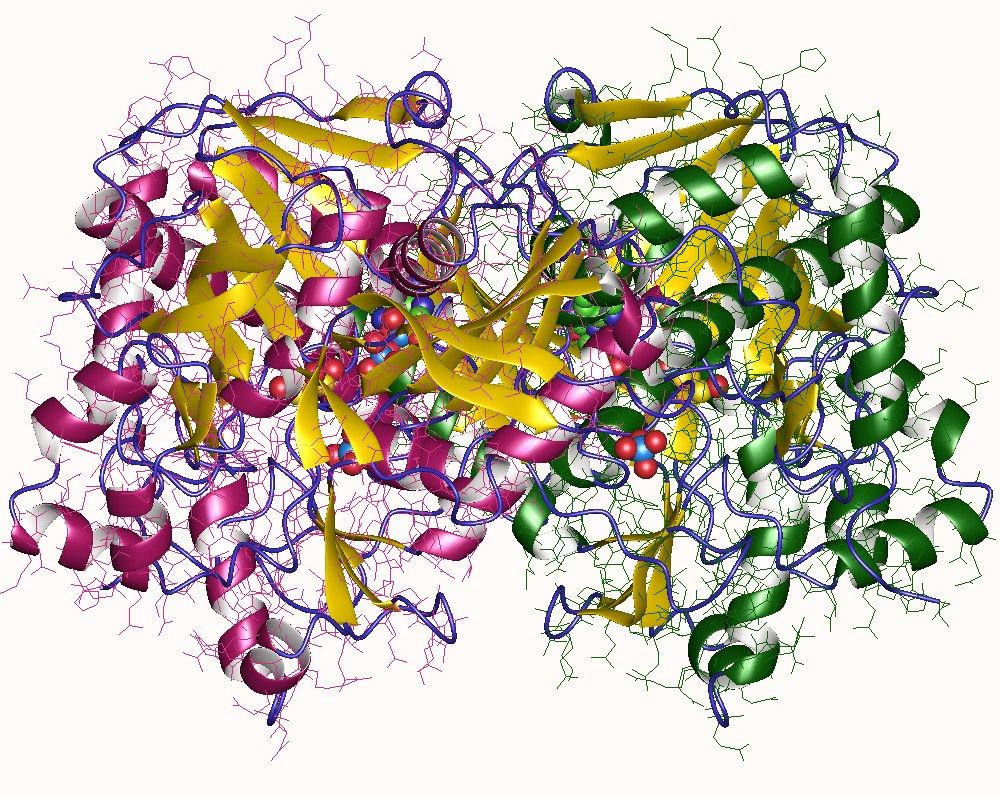
- glycerol kinase dimer, E.Coli

Identifiers
- EC no.: 2.7.1.30

Databases
- BRENDA: enzyme data
- ExPASy: NiceZyme view
- KEGG: enzyme entry
- MetaCyc: metabolic pathway
- Rhea: reactions
- PDB structures: RCSB PDB PDBe PDBsum
Search
- PMC: articles
- PubMed: articles
- NCBI: proteins

Glycerol kinase is an enzyme that in humans is encoded by the gene GK (also called GK1). More broadly, the term glycerol kinase can refer to the larger class of enzymes (EC 2.7.1.30) that catalyze the same reaction, including enzymes like glycerol kinase 2. GK is a phosphotransferase involved in triglycerides and glycerophospholipids synthesis. The enzyme catalyses the chemical reaction:

ATP +
glycerol
ADP +
(R)-glyceryl 1-phosphate

The enzyme characterised from liver converts glycerol to (R)-glyceryl 1-phosphate by transferring a phosphate group from the cofactor, adenosine triphosphate (ATP), which is converted to adenosine diphosphate (ADP).

Adipocytes lack glycerol kinase so they cannot metabolize the glycerol produced during triacyl glycerol degradation. This glycerol is instead shuttled to the liver via the blood where it is:

- Phosphorylated by glycerol kinase to glycerol 3-phosphate.
- Converted from glycerol 3-phosphate to dihydroxyacetone phosphate (DHAP) via glycerol 3-phosphate dehydrogenase. DHAP can participate in glycolysis or gluconeogenesis.

== Enzyme regulation ==
This protein may use the morpheein model of allosteric regulation.

== Structure ==
Glycerol Kinase (alternative name, ATP:glycerol 3-phosphotransferase or Glycerokinase) adopts a ribonuclease H-like fold consisting of an alpha-beta 2-layer sandwich of CATH family 3.30.420.40. As of March 2010, there were 20 structures of this protein in the PDB, most of which are homodimeric.

== Isoforms and isozymes ==
In addition to the enzyme encoded by the gene GK (often just called Glycerol kinase) there are a number of additional forms of the enzyme found in humans and other animals, encoded by the genes GK2, GK3, and GK5. These serve other functions, with, for example, GK2, being important for mitochondrial sheath formation in sperm.

The gene GK itself also produces multiple proteins through alternative splicings, which seems to affect their location in the cell. Notably, the canonical form (isoform 3) has a transmembrane domain, and is commonly located in the outer mitochondrial membrane, while isoform 4 lacks this domain, and is thought to represent the more cytosolic variety found in adult tissues.
