= Mitochondrial permeability transition pore =

Protein pore formed in mitochondria under pathological conditions

The mitochondrial permeability transition pore (mPTP or MPTP; also referred to as PTP, mTP, or MTP) is a protein pore complex that forms in the inner mitochondrial membrane under certain pathological conditions such as traumatic brain injury, ischemia, and stroke. Opening of the pore causes an increase in the permeability of the mitochondrial membrane to solutes with a molecular mass less than 1,500 daltons, leading to loss of membrane potential, swelling of the organelle, rupture of the outer membrane, and eventual cell death.

The mPTP is thought to be regulated by multiple mitochondrial proteins. Historically, Cyclophilin D and the TSPO (formerly the peripheral benzodiazepine receptor) have been considered central components. In 2025, the AAA+ ATPase protein ATAD3A was identified as a novel upstream regulator of mPTP opening. Loss of ATAD3A was shown to prevent calcium-induced pore formation and render mitochondria insensitive to cyclosporin A, suggesting it acts upstream of Cyclophilin D and is essential for permeability transition under stress.

== Roles in pathology ==
The MPTP was originally discovered by Haworth and Hunter in 1979 and has been found to be involved in neurodegeneration, hepatotoxicity from Reye-related agents, cardiac necrosis and nervous and muscular dystrophies among other deleterious events inducing cell damage and death.

MPT is one of the major causes of cell death in a variety of conditions. For example, it is key in neuronal cell death in excitotoxicity, in which overactivation of glutamate receptors causes excessive calcium entry into the cell. MPT also appears to play a key role in damage caused by ischemia, as occurs in a heart attack and stroke. However, research has shown that the MPT pore remains closed during ischemia, but opens once the tissues are reperfused with blood after the ischemic period, playing a role in reperfusion injury.

MPT is also thought to underlie the cell death induced by Reye's syndrome, since chemicals that can cause the syndrome, like salicylate and valproate, cause MPT. MPT may also play a role in mitochondrial autophagy. Cells exposed to toxic amounts of Ca^{2+} ionophores also undergo MPT and death by necrosis.

== Structure ==
While the MPT modulation has been widely studied, little is known about its structure. Initial experiments by Szabó and Zoratti proposed the MPT may comprise Voltage Dependent Anion Channel (VDAC) molecules. Nevertheless, this hypothesis was shown to be incorrect as VDAC^{−/−} mitochondria were still capable to undergo MPT.

Further hypothesis by Halestrap's group convincingly suggested the MPT was formed by the inner membrane Adenine Nucleotide Translocase (ANT), but genetic ablation of such protein still led to MPT onset.

Thus, the only MPTP components identified so far are the TSPO (previously known as the peripheral benzodiazepine receptor) located in the mitochondrial outer membrane and cyclophilin-D in the mitochondrial matrix.

Mice lacking the gene for cyclophilin-D develop normally, but their cells do not undergo Cyclosporin A-sensitive MPT, and they are resistant to necrotic death from ischemia or overload of Ca^{2+} or free radicals.

However, these cells do die in response to stimuli that kill cells through apoptosis, suggesting that MPT does not control cell death by apoptosis. Recent findings have identified ATAD3A, an inner mitochondrial membrane AAA+ ATPase, as a critical upstream modulator of mPTP formation, acting via regulation of mitochondrial cholesterol transport and cyclophilin D localization.

== Factors in MPT induction ==
Various factors enhance the likelihood of MPTP opening. In some mitochondria, such as those in the central nervous system, high levels of Ca^{2+} within mitochondria can cause the MPT pore to open. This is possibly because Ca^{2+} binds to and activates Ca^{2+} binding sites on the matrix side of the MPTP. MPT induction is also due to the dissipation of the difference in voltage across the inner mitochondrial membrane (known as transmembrane potential, or Δψ). In neurons and astrocytes, the contribution of membrane potential to MPT induction is complex, see. The presence of free radicals, another result of excessive intracellular calcium concentrations, can also cause the MPT pore to open.

Other factors that increase the likelihood that the MPTP will be induced include the presence of certain fatty acids, and inorganic phosphate. However, these factors cannot open the pore without Ca^{2+}, though at high enough concentrations, Ca^{2+} alone can induce MPT.

Stress in the endoplasmic reticulum can be a factor in triggering MPT.

Conditions that cause the pore to close or remain closed include acidic conditions, high concentrations of ADP, high concentrations of ATP, and high concentrations of NADH. Divalent cations like Mg^{2+} also inhibit MPT, because they can compete with Ca^{2+} for the Ca^{2+} binding sites on the matrix and/or cytoplasmic side of the MPTP.

== Effects ==
Multiple studies have found the MPT to be a key factor in the damage to neurons caused by excitotoxicity.

The induction of MPT, which increases mitochondrial membrane permeability, causes mitochondria to become further depolarized, meaning that Δψ is abolished. When Δψ is lost, protons and some molecules are able to flow across the outer mitochondrial membrane uninhibited. Loss of Δψ interferes with the production of adenosine triphosphate (ATP), the cell's main source of energy, because mitochondria must have an electrochemical gradient to provide the driving force for ATP production.

In cell damage resulting from conditions such as neurodegenerative diseases and head injury, opening of the mitochondrial permeability transition pore can greatly reduce ATP production, and can cause ATP synthase to begin hydrolysing, rather than producing, ATP. This produces an energy deficit in the cell, just when it most needs ATP to fuel activity of ion pumps.

MPT also allows Ca^{2+} to leave the mitochondrion, which can place further stress on nearby mitochondria, and which can activate harmful calcium-dependent proteases such as calpain.

Reactive oxygen species (ROS) are also produced as a result of opening the MPT pore. MPT can allow antioxidant molecules such as glutathione to exit mitochondria, reducing the organelles' ability to neutralize ROS. In addition, the electron transport chain (ETC) may produce more free radicals due to loss of components of the ETC, such as cytochrome c, through the MPTP. Loss of ETC components can lead to escape of electrons from the chain, which can then reduce molecules and form free radicals.

MPT causes mitochondria to become permeable to molecules smaller than 1.5 kDa, which, once inside, draw water in by increasing the organelle's osmolar load. This event may lead mitochondria to swell and may cause the outer membrane to rupture, releasing cytochrome c. Cytochrome c can in turn cause the cell to go through apoptosis ("commit suicide") by activating pro-apoptotic factors. Other researchers contend that it is not mitochondrial membrane rupture that leads to cytochrome c release, but rather another mechanism, such as translocation of the molecule through channels in the outer membrane, which does not involve the MPTP.

Much research has found that the fate of the cell after an insult depends on the extent of MPT. If MPT occurs to only a slight extent, the cell may recover, whereas if it occurs more it may undergo apoptosis. If it occurs to an even larger degree the cell is likely to undergo necrotic cell death.

== Possible evolutionary purpose ==
Although the MPTP has been studied mainly in mitochondria from mammalian sources, mitochondria from diverse species also undergo a similar transition. While its occurrence can be easily detected, its purpose still remains elusive. Some have speculated that the regulated opening of the MPT pore may minimize cell injury by causing ROS-producing mitochondria to undergo selective lysosome-dependent mitophagy during nutrient starvation conditions. Under severe stress/pathologic conditions, MPTP opening would trigger injured cell death mainly through necrosis.

There is controversy about the question of whether the MPTP is able to exist in a harmless, "low-conductance" state. This low-conductance state would not induce MPT and would allow certain molecules and ions to cross the mitochondrial membranes. The low-conductance state may allow small ions like Ca^{2+} to leave mitochondria quickly, in order to aid in the cycling of Ca^{2+} in healthy cells. If this is the case, MPT may be a harmful side effect of abnormal activity of a usually beneficial MPTP.

MPTP has been detected in mitochondria from plants, yeasts, such as Saccharomyces cerevisiae, birds, such as guinea fowl and primitive vertebrates such as the Baltic lamprey. While the permeability transition is evident in mitochondria from these sources, its sensitivity to its classic modulators may differ when compared with mammalian mitochondria. Nevertheless, CsA-insensitive MPTP can be triggered in mammalian mitochondria given appropriate experimental conditions strongly suggesting this event may be a conserved characteristic throughout the eukaryotic domain.

== See also ==
- Crista
- NMDA receptor
- NMDA receptor antagonist
