= Tetratricopeptide repeat =

Protein domain

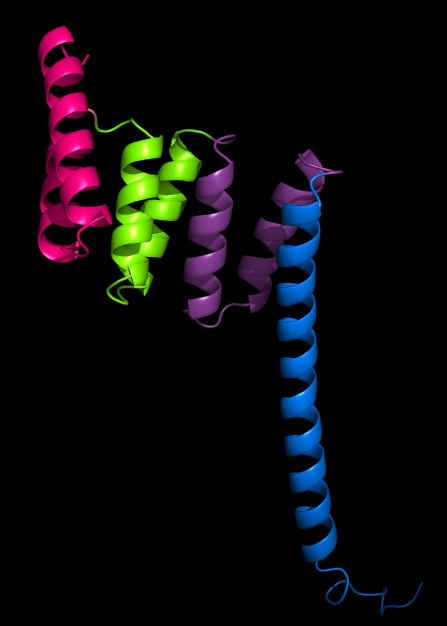

Identifiers
- Symbol: TPR_1
- Pfam: PF00515
- Pfam clan: CL0020
- ECOD: 109.4.1
- InterPro: IPR001440
- SCOP2: 1a17 / SCOPe / SUPFAM
- CDD: cd00189
Available protein structures:
- PDB: 1w3bB:89-122 1fchA:522-555 2fbnB:228-261 1p5qB:276-295 1qz2C:276-295 1ihgA:223-256 1iipA:223-256 1elwB:4-37 1wao2:28-61 1a17 :28-61 1elrA:225-258 2c2lC:27-60 1uzsA:114-147 1e96B:71-104 1hh8A:71-104 1wm5A:71-104 1kt0A:351-384 1kt1A:351-384 IPR001440 PF00515 (ECOD; PDBsum)
- AlphaFold: IPR001440; PF00515

The tetratricopeptide repeat (TPR) is a structural motif. It consists of a degenerate 34 amino acid tandem repeat identified in a wide variety of proteins. It is found in tandem arrays of 3–16 motifs, which form scaffolds to mediate protein–protein interactions and often the assembly of multiprotein complexes. These alpha-helix pair repeats usually fold together to produce a single, linear solenoid domain called a TPR domain. Proteins with such domains include the anaphase-promoting complex (APC) subunits cdc16, cdc23 and cdc27, the NADPH oxidase subunit p67-phox, hsp90-binding immunophilins, transcription factors, the protein kinase R (PKR), the major receptor for peroxisomal matrix protein import PEX5, protein arginine methyltransferase 9 (PRMT9), and mitochondrial import proteins.

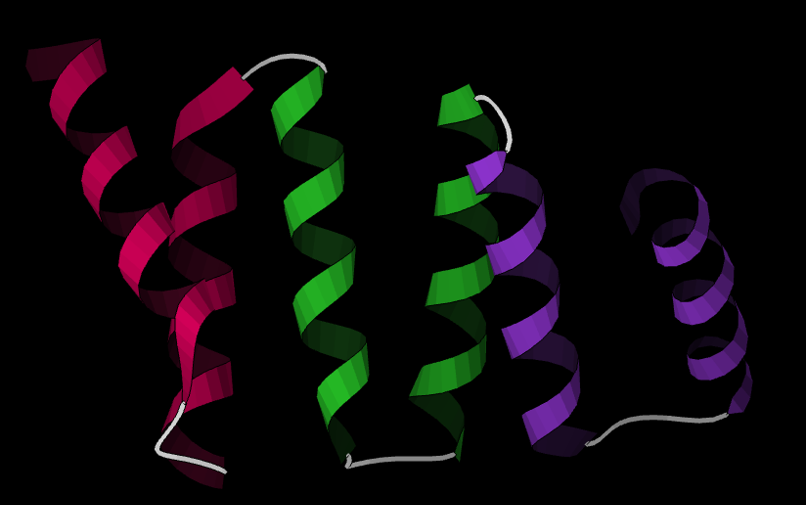
Depiction of TPR repeat. Image rendered with King Software. PDB ID: 1NA0.

== Structure ==
The structure of the PP5 protein was the first structure to be determined. The structure solved by X-ray crystallography by Das and colleagues showed that the TPR sequence motif was composed of a pair of antiparallel alpha helices. The PP5 structure contained 3 tandem TPR repeats which showed the sequential TPR repeats formed an alpha-helical solenoid structure.

A typical TPR structure is characterized by interactions between helices A and B of the first motif and helix A’ of the next TPR. Although the nature of such interactions may vary, the first two helices of the TPR motif typically have a packing angle of ~24 degrees within a single motif. Repeats of more than three TPR motifs generate a right handed superhelix characterized by both a concave and a convex face, of which the concave face is usually involved in ligand binding.

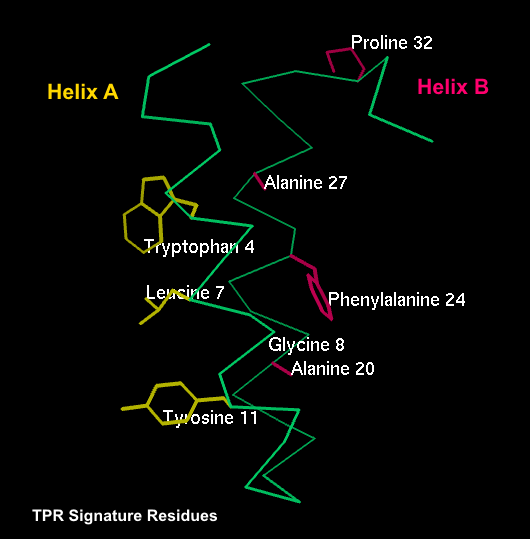
This image shows signature residues commonly found in TPR motifs. The image was rendered using the KING Software starting from the PDB 1NA3.

In terms of sequence, a TPR possesses a mixture of small and large hydrophobic residues, nonetheless, no positions are fully invariant. There are however certain residues that are usually conserved including Tryptophan 4, Leucine 7, Glycine 8, Tyrosine 11, Alanine 20, Phenylalanine 24, Alanine 27 and Proline 32. Among those 8, Alanine at positions 8, 20 and 27 tend to be more conserved. The other positions have a stronger preference for either small, large or aromatic amino acids rather than a specific residue. In between helices, residue conservation plays more of a structural role with helix breaking residues present. Between adjacent TPR, residues have roles with both structural and functional implications.

== TPR containing peptides ==
=== Hop ===
The Hop adaptor protein mediates the association of the molecular chaperones Hsp70 and Hsp90. It contains three 3-TPR repeats each with its own peptide-binding specificity. Its TPR1 domain is known to recognize the C-terminal of Hsp70 while TPR2 binds to the C-terminal of Hsp90. Both C-terminal sequences end with an EEVD motif and the nature of the interaction is both electrostatic and hydrophobic.

=== PEX5 ===
The PEX5 protein is a receptor for PTS1 (peroxisomal targeting signal tripeptide which directs proteins into peroxisomes). It interacts with the signal via TPR motifs. Most of its contacts with the C-terminal tripeptide PTS1 are in the concave face of TPRs 1, 2 and 3.

=== Neutrophil cytosolic factor 2 ===
Neutrophil cytosolic factor 2 is an essential to NADPH oxidase complex which in turn produces superoxides in response to microbial infection. The binding of the Rac GTPase is a key step into the assembly of the complex and the TPRs in the phox unit mediate the assembly of the multiprotein complex by acting a binding scaffold.

== Examples ==
Human genes encoding proteins containing this motif include:

- AAG2, ANAPC7
- BBS4
- CABIN1, CDC16, CDC23, CDC27, CNOT10, CTR9
- DNAJC3, DNAJC7, DYX1C1
- FAM10A4, FAM10A5, FKBP4, FKBP5, FKBP8, FKBPL
- GPSM1, GPSM2, GTF3C3
- IFIT1, IFIT1L, IFIT2, IFIT3, IFIT5, IFT140, IFT88
- KLC1, KLC2, KLC3, KLC4, KNS2
- LONRF2
- NARG1, NARG1L, NASP, NCF2, NFKBIL2, NOXA1, NPHP3
- OGT
- PEX5, PEX5L, PPID, PPP5C, PRPF6
- RANBP2, RANBP2L2, RANBP2L6, RAPSN, RGPD5, RGPD7, RPAP3
- SGTA, SGTB, SH3TC1, SH3TC2, SPAG1, SRP72, ST13, STIP1, STUB1, SUGT1
- TMTC1, TMTC2, TMTC3, TMTC4, TOMM34, TOMM70A
- TTC1, TTC3, TTC4, TTC5, TTC6, TTC7A, TTC7B, TTC8, TTC9C, TTC12, TTC13, TTC14, TTC15, TTC16, TTC17, TTC18, TTC21A, TTC21B, TTC22, TTC24, TTC25, TTC27, TTC28, TTC29, TTC30A, TTC30B, TTC31, TTC33, TTC37
- UNC45A, UNC45B, UTX, UTY
- WDTC1
- ZC3H7B
