= Induced cell cycle arrest =

Artificial stopping of the cell cycle

Induced cell cycle arrest is the use of a chemical or genetic manipulation to artificially halt progression through the cell cycle. Cellular processes like genome duplication and cell division stop. It can be temporary or permanent. It is an artificial activation of naturally occurring cell cycle checkpoints, induced by exogenous stimuli controlled by an experimenter.

== Model organisms ==
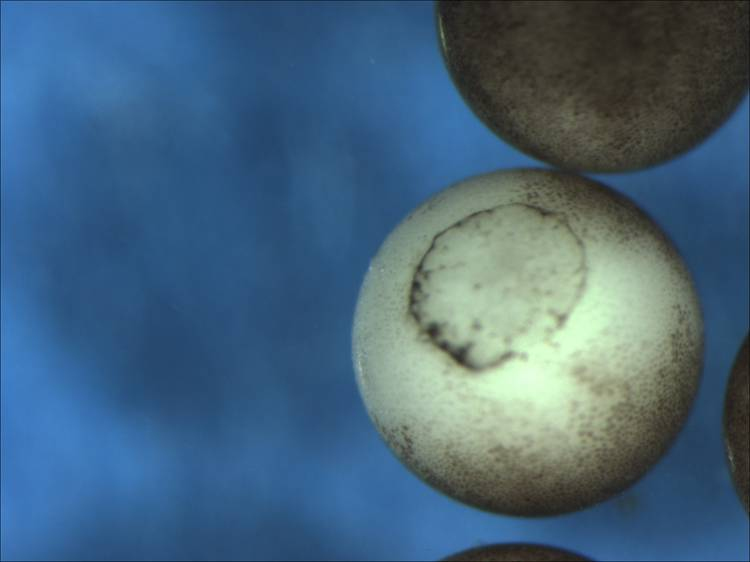
Some induced cell cycle arrests are done in Xenopus (frog) oocytes

In an academic research context, cell cycle arrest is typically performed in model organisms and cell extracts, such as Saccharomyces cerevisiae (yeast) or Xenopus oocytes (frog eggs). Frog egg cell extracts have been used extensively in cell cycle research because they are relatively large, reaching a diameter of 1mm, and so contain large amounts of protein, making protein levels more easily measurable.

== Purposes ==
There are a variety of reasons a researcher may want to temporarily or permanently prevent progress through the cell cycle.

=== Cell cycle synchronization ===
In some experiments, a researcher may want to control and synchronize the time when a group of cells progress to the next phase of the cell cycle. The cells can be induced to arrest as they arrive (at different time points) at a certain phase, so that when the arrest is lifted (for instance, rescuing cell cycle progression by introducing another chemical) all the cells resume cell cycle progression at the same time. In addition to this method acting as a scientific control for when the cells resume the cell cycle, this can be used to investigate necessity and sufficiency.

Another reason synchrony is important is the control for amount of DNA content, which varies at different parts of the cell cycle based on whether DNA replication has occurred since the last round of completed mitosis and cytokinesis.

Furthermore, synchronization of large numbers of cells into the same phase allows for the collection of large enough groups of cells in the same cycle for the use in other assays, such as western blot and RNA sequencing.

=== DNA damage repair ===
Researchers may be investigating mechanisms of DNA damage repair. Given that some of the mechanisms below of inducing cell cycle arrest involve damaging the DNA, this allows investigation into how the cell responds to damage of its genetic material.

=== Identification of in vivo protein function ===
Genetic engineering of cells with specific gene knockouts can also result in cells that arrest at different phases of the cell cycle. Examples include:

- G_{1}: Saccharomyces cerevisiae yeast expressing dominant mutant alleles of CDC28 arrest in G_{1}, which indicates that CDC28 is necessary for passage beyond the G_{1} phase.
- S: Schizosaccharomyces pombe (fission yeast) expressing a temperature-sensitive mutant form of DNA polymerase delta (pol delta ts03) arrest in S phase.
- G_{2}: Fission yeast expressing some mutant forms of CDC2 unable to arrest in G_{2} in response to DNA damage, indicating the gene product is involved in G_{2} arrest.
- M: A mutant screen of budding yeasts with mitotic arrest identified CDC16, CDC23, and CDC27 as key genes that, when mutated, cause arrest in mitosis.

== G_{1} phase arrest ==
Phases of the cell cycle

G_{1} phase is the first of the four phases of the cell cycle, and is part of interphase. While in G_{1} the cell synthesizes messenger RNA (mRNA) and proteins in preparation for subsequent steps of interphase leading to mitosis. In human somatic cells, the cell cycle lasts about 18 hours, and the G_{1} phase makes up about ^{1}/_{3} of that time. On the other hand, in frog, sea urchin, and fruit fly embryos, the G_{1} phase is extremely brief and instead is a slight gap between cytokinesis and S phase.

=== Alpha Factor ===
α-factor is a pheromone secreted by Saccharomyces cerevisiae that arrests the yeast cells in G_{1} phase. It does so by inhibiting the enzyme adenylate cyclase. The enzyme catalyzes the conversion of adenosine triphosphate (ATP) to 3',5'-cyclic AMP (cAMP) and pyrophosphate.

=== Contact inhibition ===
Contact inhibition is a method of arresting cells when neighboring cells come into contact with each other. It results in a single layer of arrested cells of arrested cells, and is a process that is notably missing in cancer cells. The suspected mechanism is dependent on p27^{Kip1}, a cyclin-dependent kinase inhibitor. p27^{Kip1} protein levels are elevated in arresting cells. This natural process can be mimicked in a lab through the overexpression of p27^{Kip1}, which results in induced cell cycle arrest in G_{1} phase.

=== Mimosine ===
Mimosine is a plant amino acid that has been shown to reversibly inhibit progression beyond G_{1} phase in some human cells, including lymphoblastoid cells. Its proposed mechanism of action is an iron/zinc chelator that depletes iron within the cell. This induces double-strand breaks in the DNA, inhibiting DNA replication. This may involve blocking the action of an iron-dependent ribonucleotide reductase. It may also inhibit transcription of serine hydroxymethyltransferase, which has zinc dependence.

=== Serum deprivation ===
In cell culture, serum is the growth medium in which the cells are grown and contains vital nutrients. The use of serum deprivation - partially or completely removing the serum and its nutrients - has been shown to arrest and synchronize cell cycle progression in G_{0} phase, for example in neonatal mammalian astrocytes and human foreskin fibroblasts.

Amino acid starvation is a similar approach. When grown in a media without some essential amino acids, such as methionine, some cells arrest in early G_{1} phase.

== S phase arrest ==
S phase follows G_{1} phase via the G_{1}/S transition and precedes G_{2} phase in interphase and is the part of the cell cycle in which DNA is replicated. Since accurate duplication of the genome is critical to successful cell division, the processes that occur during S-phase are tightly regulated and widely conserved. Pre-replication complexes assembled before S phase are converted into active replication forks. Driving this conversion is Cdc7 and S-phase cyclin-dependent kinases, which are both upregulated after the G_{1}/S transition.

=== Aphidicolin ===
Aphidicolin is an antibiotic isolated from the fungus Cephalosporum aphidicola. It is a reversible inhibitor of eukaryotic nuclear DNA replication that blocks progression past the S phase. Its mechanism is the inhibition of DNA polymerase A and D. A structural study found that this is thought to occur through binding the alpha active site of the polymerase and "rotating the template guanine," which prevents deoxycytidine triphosphate (dCTP) from binding. This S phase block induces apoptosis in HeLa cells.

=== Hydroxyurea ===
Hydroxyurea (HU) is a small molecule drug that inhibits the enzyme ribonucleotide reductase (RNR), preventing the catalysis of converting deoxyribonucleotides (DNTs) to ribonucleotides. It is hypothesized that there is tyrosyl free radical within RNR that is disabled by HU. The free radicals are necessary for the reduction of the DNTs and are scavenged by HU instead. HU has been shown to arrest cells in both S phase (healthy cells) and immediately before cytokinesis (mutant cells).

=== 2,3-DCPE ===
23-(2,3-dichlorophenoxy)propyl aminoethanol (2,3-DCPE) is a small-molecule that induces S phase arrest. This was demonstrated in cancer cell lines and downregulates expression of B-cell lymphoma-extra large (Bcl-XL), an anti-apoptotic protein that prevents the release of mitochondrial contents like cytochrome c.

== G_{2} phase arrest ==
G_{2} phase is the final part of interphase and directly precedes mitosis. It will only be entered in regular cells if the DNA replication in S phase is completed successfully. It is a period of rapid cell growth and protein synthesis during which the cell prepares itself for mitosis.

=== Destruction of cyclin mRNA ===
Cyclins are proteins that control progression through the cell cycle by activating cyclin-dependent kinases. Destruction of a cell's endogenous cyclin messenger RNA can arrest frog egg extracts in interphase and prevent them from entering mitosis. Introduction of exogenous cyclin mRNA is also sufficient to rescue cell cycle progression. One method of this destruction is through the use of antisense oligonucleotides, pieces of RNA that bind to the cyclin mRNA and prevent the mRNA from being translated into cyclin protein. This can actually be used to destroy phase-specific cyclins beyond just G_{2} - for instance, destruction of cyclin D1 mRNA by antisense oligonucleotides prevents progression from G_{1} phase to S phase.

== Mitotic arrest ==
Mitosis is the non-interphase part of the cell cycle and generates two daughter cells

Mitosis is the final part of the cell cycle and follows interphase. It is composed of four phases - prophase, metaphase, anaphase, and telophase - and involves the condensation of the chromosomes in the nucleus, the dissolution of the nuclear envelope, and the separation of sister chromatids by spindle fibers. As mitosis concludes, the spindle fibers disappear and the nuclear membrane reforms around each of the two sets of chromosomes. After successful mitosis, the cell physically splits into two identical daughter cells in a process called cytokinesis, and this concludes a full round of the cell cycle. Each of these new cells could then potentially re-enter G_{1} phase and begin the cell cycle again.

=== Nocodazole ===
Nocodazole is a chemical agent that interferes with the polymerization of microtubules. Cells treated with nocodazole arrest with a G_{2} or M phase DNA content, which can be verified with flow cytometry. From microscopy it has been determined they do enter mitosis but they cannot form the spindles necessary for metaphase because the microtubules cannot polymerize. Research into the mechanism has hinted at it potentially preventing tubulin from forming its alpha/beta heterodimer.

=== Taxol ===
Taxol works in the opposite way of nocodazole, instead stabilizing the microtubule polymer and preventing it from disassembly. It also causes M phase arrest, as the spindle that is supposed to pull apart sister chromatids is unable to disassemble. It acts through a specific binding site on the microtubule polymer, and as such does not require GTP or other cofactors to induce tubulin polymerization.

=== Temperature ===
Temperature has been shown to regulate HeLa cell cycle progression. Mitosis was found to be the most temperature-sensitive part of the cell cycle. Pre-cytokinesis mitotic arrest was visible through accumulation of cells in mitosis in below-normal temperatures between 24 and 31 °C (75.2-87.8 °F).

== Verification ==
There are several methods that can be used to verify that cells have been arrested in the proper phase.

=== Flow cytometry ===
Flow cytometry is a technique of measuring physical and chemical characteristics of a population of cells using lasers and fluorophore dyes covalently linked to protein markers. The stronger the signal, the more of a particular protein is present. Staining with DNA dyes propidium iodide or 4',6'-diamidino-2-phenylindole (DAPI) allows delineation or sorting of cells between G_{1,} S, or G_{2}/M phases.

=== Immunoblotting ===
Immunoblotting is the detection of specific proteins in a tissue sample or extract. Primary antibodies recognize and bind the protein in question, and secondary antibodies are added that recognize the primary antibodies. The secondary antibody is then visualized through staining or immunofluorescence, allowing indirect detection of the original target protein.

Immunoblotting can be performed to detect the presence of cyclins, proteins that regulate the cell cycle. Different classes of cyclins are up- and down-regulated at different parts of the cell cycle. Measurement of the cyclins from an extract of an arrested cell can determine what phase the cell is in. For example, a peak of cyclin E protein would indicate the G_{1}/S transition, a cyclin A peak would indicate late G_{2} phase, and a cyclin B peak would indicate mitosis.

=== Fluorescence ubiquitination-based cell cycle indication (FUCCI) ===
FUCCI is a system that takes advantage of cell cycle phase-specific expression of proteins and their degradation by the ubiquitin-proteasome pathway. Two fluorescent probes - Cdt1 and Geminin conjugated to fluorescent proteins - allow for real-time visualization of the cell cycle phase a cell is in.
