= Interferon-stimulated gene =

Gene that can be expressed in response to stimulation by interferon

An interferon-stimulated gene (ISG) is a gene that can be expressed in response to stimulation by interferon. Interferons bind to receptors on the surface of a cell, initiating protein signaling pathways within the cell. This interaction leads to the expression of a subset of genes involved in the innate immune system response. ISGs are commonly expressed in response to viral infection, but also during bacterial infection and in the presence of parasites. It's currently estimated that 10% of the human genome is regulated by interferons (IFNs). Interferon stimulated genes can act as an initial response to pathogen invasion, slowing down viral replication and increasing expression of immune signaling complexes. There are three known types of interferon. With approximately 450 genes highly expressed in response to interferon type I. Type I interferon consists of INF-α, INF-β, INF-ω and is expressed in response to viral infection. ISGs induced by type I interferon are associated with viral replication suppression and increase expression of immune signaling proteins. Type II interferon consists only of INF-γ and is associated with controlling intracellular pathogens and tumor suppressor genes. Type III interferon consists of INF-λ and is associated with viral immune response and is key in anti-fungal neutrophil response.

== Expression ==
ISGs are genes whose expression can be stimulated by interferon, but may also be stimulated by other pathways. Interferons are a type of protein called a cytokine, which is produced in response to infection. When released, they signal to infected cells and other nearby cells that a pathogen is present.

This signal is passed from one cell to another by binding of the interferon to a cell surface receptor on a naïve cell. The receptor and interferon are taken inside the cell while bound to initiate expression of ISGs.

Interferon activation of ISGs uses the JAK-STAT signaling pathway to induce transcription of ISGs. ISGs can be divided based on what class of interferon they are activated by: type I, type II, or type III interferon. The protein products of ISGs control pathogen infections.

Specifically, type I and type III interferons are antiviral cytokines, triggering ISGs that combat viral infections. Type I interferons are also involved in bacterial infections; however, they can have both beneficial and harmful effects. The type II interferon class only has one cytokine (IFN-γ), which has some antiviral activity, but is more important in establishing cellular immunity through activating macrophages and promoting major histocompatibility complex (MHC) class II.

All ISG stimulation pathways result in the production of transcription factors. Type I and type III interferons produce a protein complex called ISGF3, which acts as a transcription factor, and binds to a promoter sequence called ISRE (interferon stimulated response element). Type II interferons produce a transcription factor called GAF, which binds to a promoter sequence called GAS. These interactions initiate gene expression. These pathways are also commonly initiated by a Toll-like receptor (TLR) on the cell surface. The number and type of ISGs expressed in response to infection is specific to the infecting pathogen.

== Family of interferon-stimulated genes ==
=== IFIT family of interferon-stimulated genes ===
The IFIT family of ISGs is located on chromosome 10 in humans and is homologous in mammals, birds, and fish. The IFIT family is commonly induced by type I and type III interferon. IFIT gene expression has been observed in response to both DNA and RNA viral infection. IFIT genes suppress viral infection primarily by limiting viral RNA and DNA replication. IFIT proteins 1,2,3 and 5 can bind directly to double-stranded triphosphate RNA. These IFIT proteins form a complex that destroys the viral RNA. IFIT 1 and IFIT 2 directly bind Eukaryotic initiation factor 3, which reduces more than 60% of protein translation in the targeted cell.

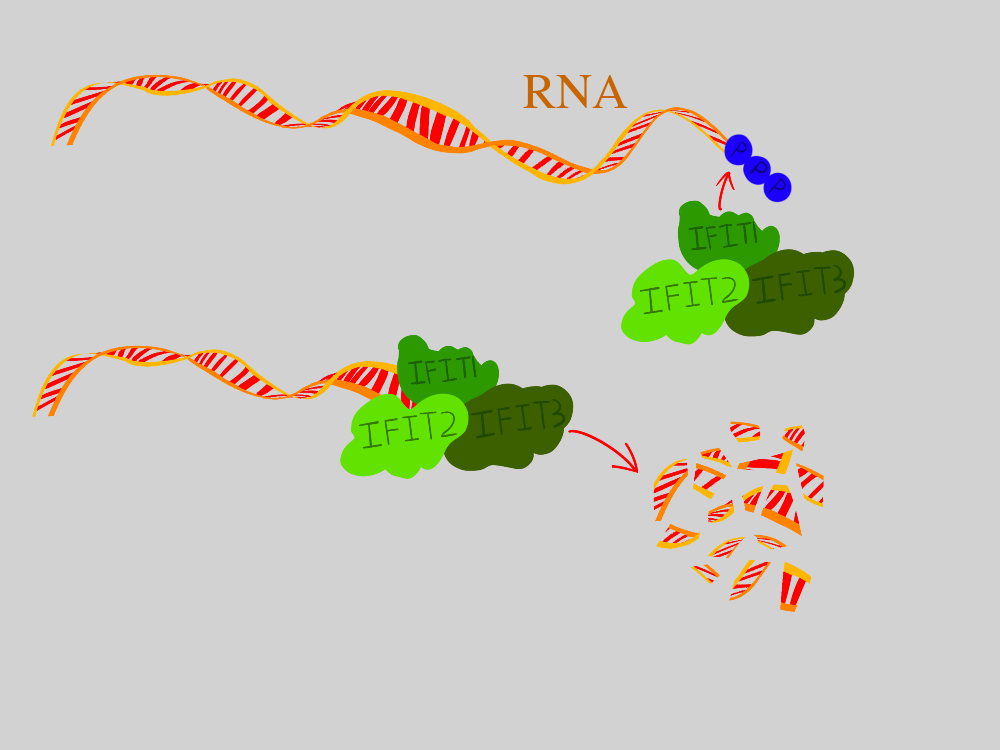
IFIT proteins binding to double-stranded triphosphate RNA and degrading the RNA

== Function ==
ISGs have a wide range of functions used to combat infection at all stages of a pathogen's lifestyle. For a viral infection, examples include: prohibiting entry of the virus into uninfected cells, stopping viral replication, and preventing the virus from leaving an infected cell.

Another ISG function is regulating interferon sensitivity of a cell. The expression of pattern recognition receptors like a TLR or common signaling proteins like those found in the JAK-STAT pathway may be up regulated by interferons, making the cell more sensitive to interferons.

As such a large portion of the human genome is associated with interferon ISG have a broad range of functions. ISG are essential for fighting off viral bacterial and parasitic pathogens. Interferon stimulates genes that help active immune response and suppress infection at almost all stages of infection.

=== Inhibition of viral RNA ===
There are 21 known ISGs that inhibit RNA virus replication. Primarily ISG bind to and degrade RNA to prevent viral instructions from being translated into viral proteins. These ISG can specifically target double stranded triphosphate RNA which is distinct from single stranded RNA present in human cells. ISG can also non specifically target mRNA and destroy it. Cell wide mRNA degradation prevents both viral and host proteins from being produced. The mRNA of INF-α and other key immune proteins are resistant to this cell wide degradation to allow immune signals to continue while translation is inhibited.

=== Apoptotic effects ===
There are 15 known ISG that help induce apoptosis. It is likely that none of these genes trigger apoptosis alone but their expression has been linked to apoptosis. Higher expression of ISG make the cell more susceptible to natural killer cells.

== See also ==
- Interferome
