= IFIT proteins =

IFIT proteins (Interferon Induced proteins with tetratricopeptide repeats) are produced in the human body and are supposed to confer immunity against viral infections. These proteins are generally produced during viral infection by interferon (IFN) treatment as well as during pathogen recognition (Pathogen associated molecular pattern recognition) by the immune system during infections.

So far, four families of this protein have been identified in humans which are IFIT1, IFIT2, IFIT3, and IFIT5 and other variants have been found in different species. For example, there are three mouse members (IFIT1, IFIT2, and IFIT3). Birds, marsupials, frogs and fish have been found to produce only IFIT5 type proteins. These proteins differ from each other in having different numbers of tetratricopeptide repeats (TPRs) which typically contains 34 amino acids with the consensus sequence [WLF]-X(2)-[LIM]-[GAS]-X (2)-[YLF]-X(8)-[ASE]-X(3)-[FYL]-X(2)-[ASL]-X(4)-[PKE] that adopts a basic helix-turn-helix fold. The IFIT1 is known to possess 6 TPRs and IFIT2 has 4 TPRs. The IFIT proteins that are produced in humans and mice are 40%-45% similar. It is thought that the gene encoding IFIT proteins in different species has a common ancestry.

== Origins of IFIT proteins ==
IFIT protein encoding genes (IFIT genes) are known to have originated in vertebrates about 450 million years ago. These genes are mostly conserved throughout evolution suggesting that they have a common protective role in all species.

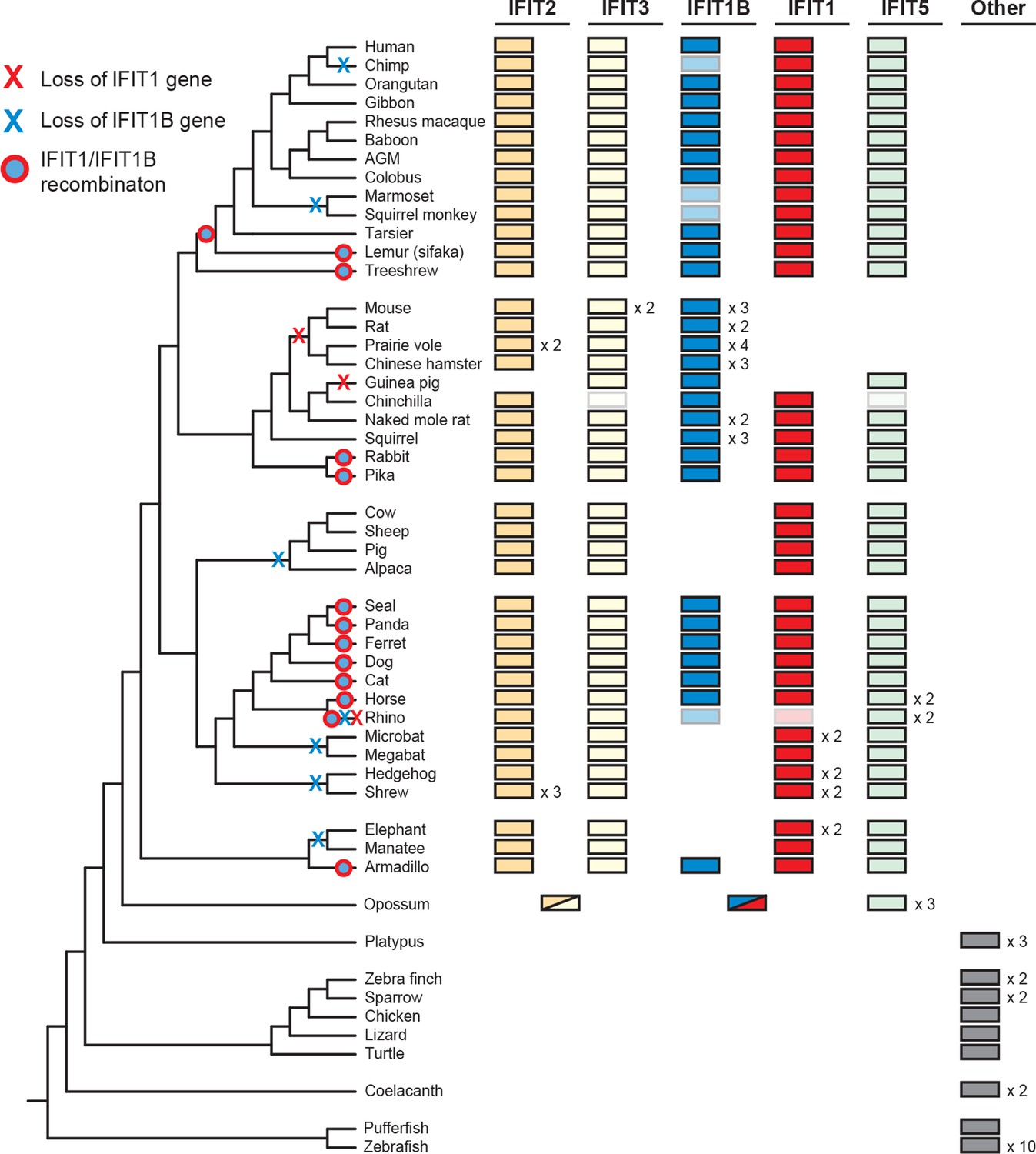
Widespread gene birth, loss and conversion in vertebrate IFIT genes: A summary table of the IFIT genes of vertebrate species

== Anti viral mechanism of IFIT proteins ==
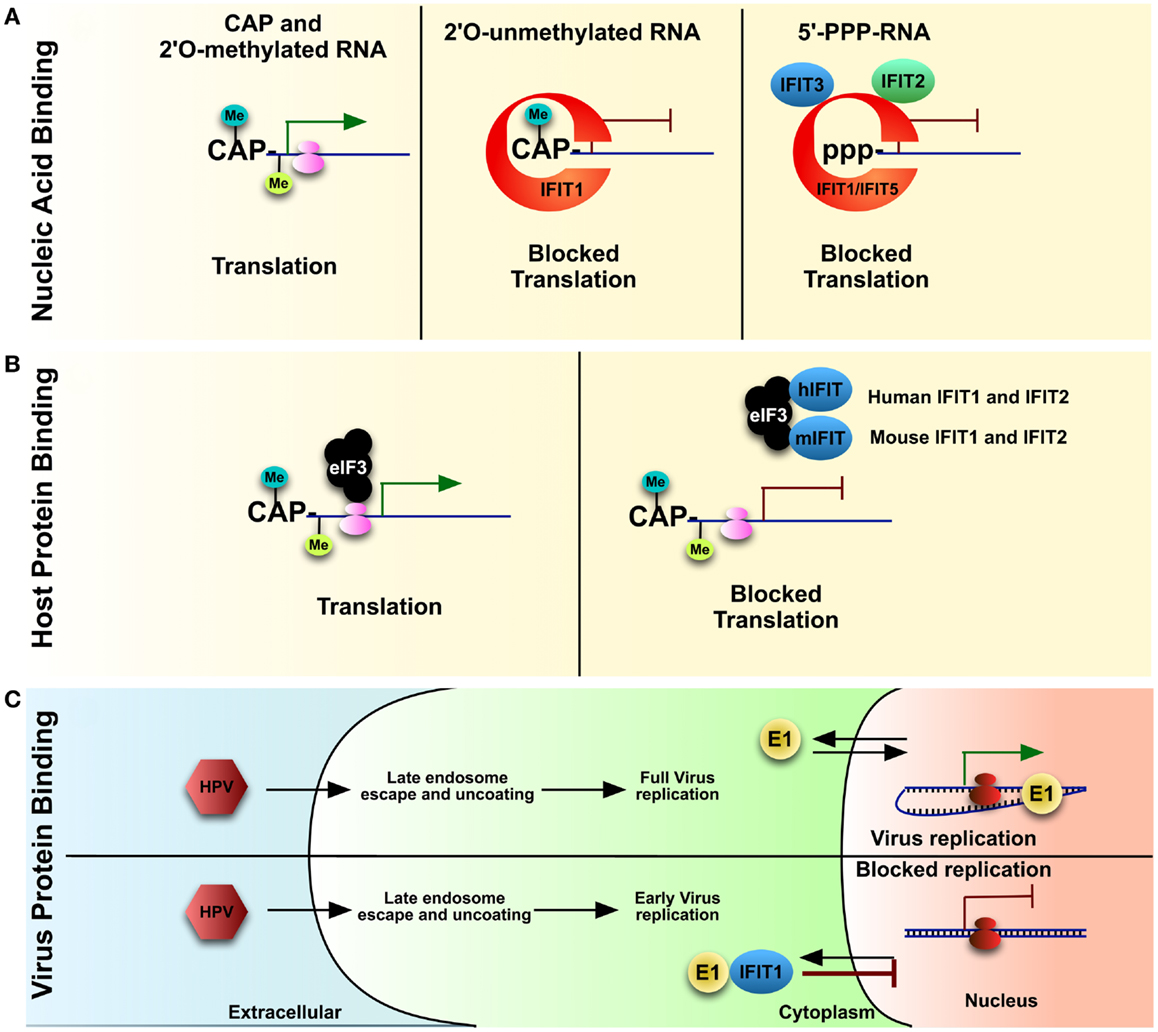
IFITs, play various roles in blocking virus and host protein translation

IFIT proteins are suggested to slow anti viral activity in three ways:(see figure)

1. Binding to viral nucleic acids with specific RNA 5' caps or 5' end structure

This is based on 5′-triphosphorylated RNA and Cap-0 RNA binding. Cap-0 is a messenger RNA cap that has N7-methyl guanosine but lacks the 2' O-methylation found in Cap-1, which is important in evading the innate immune response as detection as non-self RNA.

Experimental data and the three dimensional structure of IFIT1 reveals that the proteins bind to viral PPP RNA in a sequence specific manner. Few viruses like Rift Valley fever virus, vesicular stomatitis virus, and influenza A produce PPP RNA nucleic acid during their life cycle.

2. Directly binding to eukaryotic initiation factor 3 (eIF3) and preventing eIF3 from initiating the translational process.

3. Directly binding to viral proteins
