= TMTC =

TMTC means "too many to count". It may also refer to:

- TriMet, reporting code for an Oregon rail system
- Tata Management Training Centre
- Traffic Motor Truck Corporation
- TMTC gene family, which includes TMTC2 and TMTC4
