= ANAPC5 =

Protein-coding gene in humans

Identifiers
- Aliases: ANAPC5, APC5, anaphase promoting complex subunit 5
- External IDs: OMIM: 606948; MGI: 1929722; GeneCards: ANAPC5
Available structures
PDB	Ortholog search: PDBe RCSB
PDB	List of PDB id codes 4UI9, 5A31, 5G05, 5G04

Gene location (Human)
Chr.	Chromosome 12 (human)
Band	12q24.31	Start	121,308,245 bp
Band	12q24.31	End	121,399,896 bp

Gene location (Mouse)
Chr.	Chromosome 5 (mouse)
Band	5|5 F	Start	122,925,522 bp
Band	5|5 F	End	122,959,402 bp
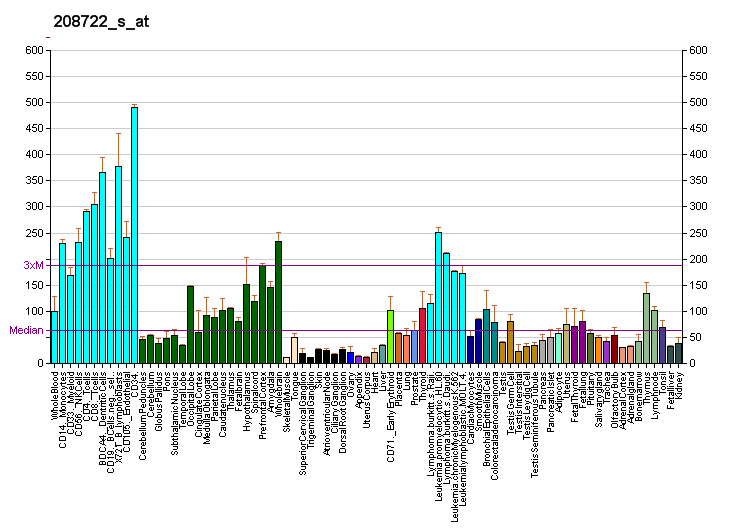

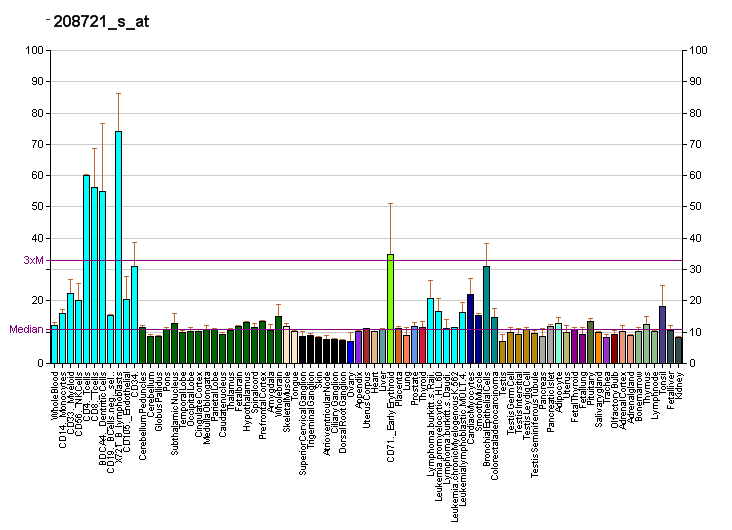

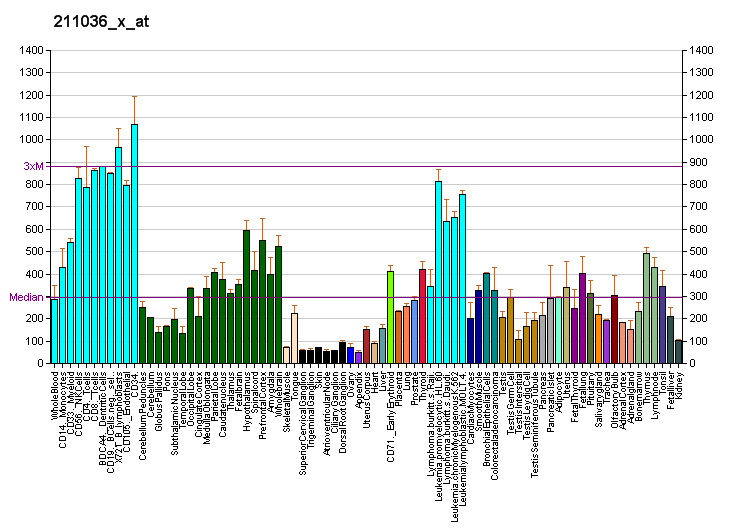
RNA expression pattern
Bgee	Human / Mouse (ortholog); Top expressed in: right uterine tube; body of pancreas; bronchial epithelial cell; tibia; canal of the cervix; skin of hip; body of uterus; corpus callosum; tibial nerve; right ovary / Top expressed in: fossa; condyle; internal carotid artery; external carotid artery; fetal liver hematopoietic progenitor cell; Paneth cell; superior cervical ganglion; hair follicle; trigeminal ganglion; vas deferens; More reference expression data
BioGPS	More reference expression data
Gene ontology
Molecular function	protein phosphatase binding; ubiquitin protein ligase activity
Cellular component	nucleoplasm; cytosol; nucleus; anaphase-promoting complex
Biological process	cell cycle; anaphase-promoting complex-dependent catabolic process; protein ubiquitination; protein K11-linked ubiquitination; cell division; positive regulation of mitotic metaphase/anaphase transition; regulation of mitotic cell cycle phase transition; ubiquitin-dependent protein catabolic process
Sources:Amigo / QuickGO
Orthologs
Databases	NCBI: entry; OMA: entry
Species	Human	Mouse
Entrez	51433	59008
Ensembl	ENSG00000089053	ENSMUSG00000029472
UniProt	Q9UJX4	Q8BTZ4
RefSeq (mRNA)	NM_001137559; NM_016237; NM_001330489	NM_001042491; NM_001289517; NM_001289518; NM_001289519; NM_001289520 NM_021505
RefSeq (protein)	NP_001131031; NP_001317418; NP_057321	NP_001035956; NP_001276446; NP_001276447; NP_001276448; NP_001276449 NP_067480
Location (UCSC)	Chr 12: 121.31 – 121.4 Mb	Chr 5: 122.93 – 122.96 Mb
PubMed search
- Wikidata
View/Edit Human	View/Edit Mouse

Anaphase-promoting complex subunit 5 is an enzyme that in humans is encoded by the ANAPC5 gene.

The anaphase-promoting complex (APC) consists of at least eight protein subunits, including ANAPC5 (this gene) , CDC27 (APC3; MIM 116946), CDC16 (APC6; MIM 603461), and CDC23 (APC8; MIM 603462).[supplied by OMIM]

== Interactions ==
ANAPC5 has been shown to interact with ANAPC1, ANAPC4, CDC27 and PABPC1.
