= IFit =

iFit or Ifit may refer to

- iFit proteins
- Ifit, the name for Intsia bijuga in the Mariana Islands
