= BtpA protein =

BtpA

Identifiers
- Symbol: BtpA
- Pfam: PF03437
- Pfam clan: CL0036
- InterPro: IPR005137
Available protein structures:
- PDB: IPR005137 PF03437 (ECOD; PDBsum)
- AlphaFold: IPR005137; PF03437

In molecular biology, the BtpA protein family is a family of proteins which includes BtpA. BtpA appears to play a role in the stabilisation of photosystem I. It is an extrinsic membrane protein located on the cytoplasmic side of the thylakoid membrane. Homologs of BtpA are found in the Thermoproteota and "Euryarchaeota", where their function remains unknown. The Ycf4 protein is firmly associated with the thylakoid membrane, presumably through a transmembrane domain. Ycf4 co-fractionates with a protein complex larger than PSI upon sucrose density gradient centrifugation of solubilised thylakoids. The Ycf3 protein is loosely associated with the thylakoid membrane and can be released from the membrane with sodium carbonate. This suggests that Ycf3 is not part of a stable complex and that it probably interacts transiently with its partners. Ycf3 contains a number of tetratricopeptide repeats (TPR); TPR is a structural motif present in a wide range of proteins, which mediates protein-protein interactions.
