= Tetratricopeptide repeat protein 16 =

Protein-coding gene in the species Homo sapiens

TTC16

Identifiers
- Aliases: TTC16, tetratricopeptide repeat domain 16, Tetratricopeptide repeat domain 16 isoform 1
- External IDs: MGI: 2443048; GeneCards: TTC16

Gene location (Human)
Chr.	Chromosome 9 (human)
Band	9q34.11	Start	127,716,079 bp
Band	9q34.11	End	127,731,590 bp

Gene location (Mouse)
Chr.	Chromosome 2 (mouse)
Band	2|2 B	Start	32,647,038 bp
Band	2|2 B	End	32,665,645 bp
RNA expression pattern
Bgee	Human / Mouse (ortholog); Top expressed in: right uterine tube; bronchial epithelial cell; granulocyte; right testis; left testis; olfactory zone of nasal mucosa; mucosa of paranasal sinus; sperm; blood; epithelium of nasopharynx / Top expressed in: interventricular septum; seminiferous tubule; spermatocyte; spermatid; right ventricle; basisphenoid; yolk sac; pineal gland; olfactory epithelium; occiput; More reference expression data
BioGPS	n/a
Orthologs
Databases	NCBI: entry; OMA: entry
Species	Human	Mouse
Entrez	158248	338348
Ensembl	ENSG00000167094	ENSMUSG00000039021
UniProt	Q8NEE8	Q8C1F5
RefSeq (mRNA)	NM_144965; NM_001317037	NM_001290563; NM_001290564; NM_001290566; NM_001290567; NM_177384
RefSeq (protein)	NP_001303966; NP_659402	NP_001277492; NP_001277493; NP_001277495; NP_001277496; NP_796358
Location (UCSC)	Chr 9: 127.72 – 127.73 Mb	Chr 2: 32.65 – 32.67 Mb
PubMed search
- Wikidata
View/Edit Human	View/Edit Mouse

Tetratricopeptide repeat domain 16 (TTC16) is an uncharacterized protein that in humans is encoded by the gene TTC16. Another alias for this gene is TPR repeat protein 16, but this is not commonly used. TTC16 is one of many proteins that contain tetratricopeptide repeat motifs as a supersecondary structure.

== Gene ==
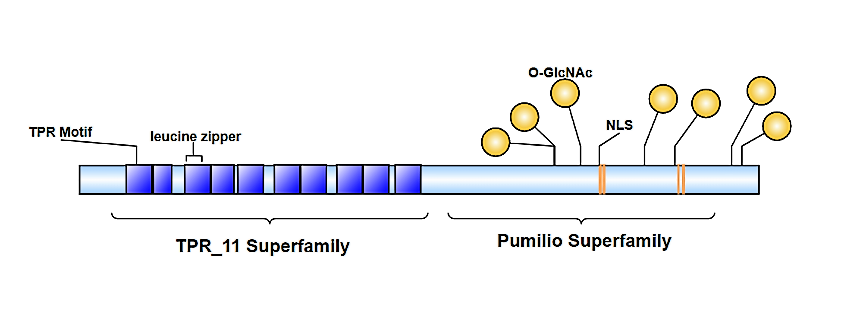
A visual representation of major domains and post translational sites on TTC16.

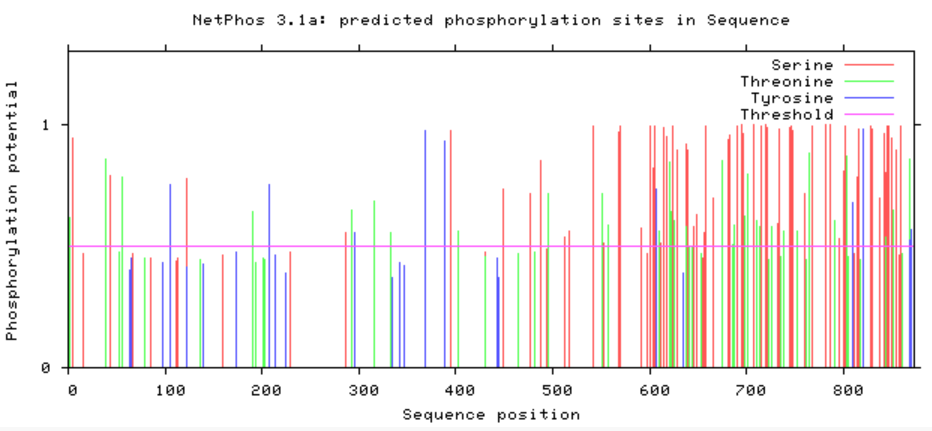
Predicted serine, threonine, and tyrosine phosphorylation sites of TTC16.

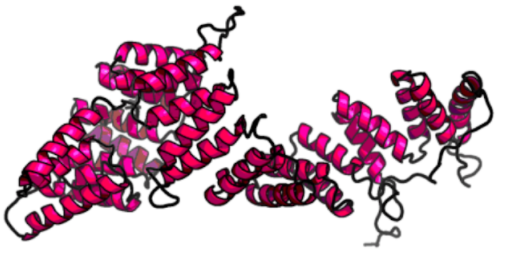
A predicted model for TTC16, with 63% of the sequence fully modeled and 41% of positions disordered.

The TTC16 gene is located on human chromosome 9 at site 9q34.11. TTC16 is made up of ten tetratricopeptide motifs and has 16 exons. Other notable TPR containing peptides include HOP, PEX5, and neutrophil cytosolic factor 2. TTC16 is highly conserved among species, found among invertebrates such as the eastern oyster (Crassostrea virginica) and the purple sea urchin (Strongylocentrotus purpuratus). TTC16 has no paralogs.

=== Transcription factors ===
The many transcription factors of TTC16 are commonly found in cells of the immune system, including several types of white blood cells and red blood cells, the respiratory system, and the endocrine system.

== Protein ==
The TPR motifs that make up TTC16 belong to the TPR_11 super family, while the later half of the protein is made of the Pumilio Superfamily. The molecular weight is 98.3 kdal and the isoelectric point is 9.15 making TTC16 a basic protein. In total, the TTC16 protein is 873 amino acids in length. There are two isoforms, of which variant 1 is the longest. There are 17 spliced versions of the gene.

=== Post translational modifications ===
The protein contains many putative binding sites and forms alpha helix chains. Within the cell, TTC16 is found within the nucleus. Most of the post translational modifications are concentrated in the latter half, phosphorylation in particular is constant in the Pumilio Superfamily region. There are also 4 nuclear localization signals and 7 O-linked glycosylation sites. There are no N-linked glycosylation sites.

=== Structure ===
TTC16 forms several alpha helices and coiled-coil regions. Domains containing TPR motifs show stronger stability than regions without.

=== Protein interactions ===
There is only one known case of TTC16 interaction, involving polymerase basic protein 2 (pb2). Pb2 is involved in transcription initiation and the generation of primers for viral transcription.

== Expression ==
TTC16 is found in high numbers in the testis, followed by the lung, pituitary gland, and tonsil. Evidence shows the omental adipose tissue of obese children have higher expression of TTC16 in comparison to non-obese children. Expression is also relatively high and constant CD8+ cells.

== Function ==
Tetratricopeptide motifs often act as stabilizers in protein-protein interactions. While the specific function of TTC16 isn't well understood by scientists, many other proteins containing TPR motifs give insight into its possible activity. Because of the many connections to the immune system, such as tissue expression and transcription factors, it is thought that TTC16 plays a role in immune system response.
