= Eric Poeschla =

HIV/AIDS researcher

Eric Murnane Poeschla
- Education: Yale School of Medicine; University of California, San Francisco
- Scientific career
- Fields: Virology
- Workplaces: University of Colorado Denver

Eric Murnane Poeschla is an American infectious disease physician, virologist, and innate immunologist.

== Education ==
Poeschla graduated from the Yale School of Medicine in 1985 and completed his residency in internal medicine at the University of California, San Francisco School of Medicine in 1988, which was followed by a year of tropical medicine training in Papua New Guinea.

== Career ==
Poeschla was the project physician for the 1990 Vanderbilt University Petexbatun Maya Archaeology Expedition in Dos Pilas, Guatemala. After infectious disease fellowship and post-doctoral training in virology at the University of California, San Diego School of Medicine, he joined the Mayo Clinic College of Medicine in 1999, where he was Professor of Molecular Medicine and directed research focused on the HIV life cycle.

Since 2014, Poeschla has been Professor of Medicine and Chief of the Infectious Diseases Division at the University of Colorado School of Medicine, where he also holds the Tim Gill Endowed Chair in HIV Research and has helped direct the institutional response to the COVID-19 pandemic. Poeschla was elected to the Association of American Physicians (AAP) in 2016. He lives in Denver.

== Research ==
Poeschla's laboratory is interested in how viruses interact with, use, or evade cellular proteins as they replicate, as well as innate immunity, and viral emergence. Early work determined how FIV, the feline HIV-like virus, carries out its life cycle. It also established FIV-based lentiviral vectors.

Subsequent research included contributions to identifying the role of a cellular protein (LEDGF) in the chromosomal attachment and integration step of HIV, and investigations of other cellular factors that regulate the HIV life cycle. More recent studies have further concerned cellular innate immune defenses to other RNA viruses as well. The laboratory uses picornavirus RNA polymerase-transgenic mouse models to investigate Interferon-stimulated gene (ISG) responses triggered by viral double-stranded RNA via the sensor MDA5.

In 2020, a restriction to primate lentiviruses (HIV and related simian viruses) was reported in cells of large bats.
