= DNAAF4 =

Protein-coding gene in humans

Identifiers
- Aliases: DNAAF4, CILD25, DYX1, DYXC1, EKN1, RD, DYX1C1, dyslexia susceptibility 1 candidate 1, dynein axonemal assembly factor 4
- External IDs: OMIM: 608706; MGI: 1914935; GeneCards: DNAAF4

Gene location (Human)
Chr.	Chromosome 15 (human)
Band	15q21.3	Start	55,410,525 bp
Band	15q21.3	End	55,508,234 bp

Gene location (Mouse)
Chr.	Chromosome 9 (mouse)
Band	9|9 D	Start	72,866,067 bp
Band	9|9 D	End	72,880,346 bp
RNA expression pattern
Bgee	Human / Mouse (ortholog); Top expressed in: bronchial epithelial cell; secondary oocyte; mucosa of paranasal sinus; testicle; olfactory zone of nasal mucosa; right uterine tube; gonad; right lobe of thyroid gland; epithelium of nasopharynx; left lobe of thyroid gland / Top expressed in: spermatocyte; seminiferous tubule; saccule; morula; otic vesicle; embryo; spermatid; embryo; blastocyst; vestibular sensory epithelium; More reference expression data
BioGPS	n/a
Gene ontology
Molecular function	estrogen receptor binding; protein binding
Cellular component	nucleus; plasma membrane; cytoplasm; centrosome; cytosol; non-motile cilium; extracellular region
Biological process	nervous system development; outer dynein arm assembly; regulation of intracellular estrogen receptor signaling pathway; regulation of proteasomal protein catabolic process; determination of left/right symmetry; inner dynein arm assembly; neuron migration; cilium movement; epithelial cilium movement involved in extracellular fluid movement; development of the heart
Sources:Amigo / QuickGO
Orthologs
Databases	NCBI: entry; OMA: entry
Species	Human	Mouse
Entrez	161582	67685
Ensembl	ENSG00000256061	ENSMUSG00000092192
UniProt	Q8WXU2	Q8R368
RefSeq (mRNA)	NM_130810; NM_001033559; NM_001033560	NM_001163725; NM_026314
RefSeq (protein)	NP_001028731; NP_001028732; NP_570722	NP_001157197; NP_080590
Location (UCSC)	Chr 15: 55.41 – 55.51 Mb	Chr 9: 72.87 – 72.88 Mb
PubMed search
- Wikidata
View/Edit Human	View/Edit Mouse

Dynein axonemal assembly factor 4 is a protein that in humans is encoded by the DNAAF4 gene (often also called DYX1C1). This protein contains 420 amino acids with 3 tetratricopeptide repeat (TPR) domains, thought to mediate protein–protein interactions. It is a protein-coding gene strongly associated with susceptibility to developmental dyslexia, a learning disorder that affects reading ability in otherwise typically developing individuals.

== Gene ==
Although the gene does not show strong homology to many well-characterized proteins, it is highly conserved across species, with significant similarity between humans, mice, and nonhuman primates, indicating an important biological function.

== Structure ==
The DYX1C1 protein consists of approximately 420 amino acids and is characterized by the presence of three tetratricopeptide repeat (TPR) domains, which are structural motifs known to facilitate protein–protein interactions. These domains suggest that DYX1C1 functions as part of larger molecular complexes, potentially playing a role in regulating cellular processes critical for brain development.

== Function ==
The DYX1C1 gene play a crucial role in the function of motile cilia that are on the surface of cells in eukaryotes that beat in sense of rhythmic waves to move fluids, mucus, or cells across tissue surfaces. Research shows that when this gene is disrupted (function has been changed) the leading to defects in the inner and out dynein arms this is required for ciliary motion resulting in conditions like primary ciliary dyskinesia (PCD).Evidence from mice, zebrafish, and humans demonstrates that DYX1C1 acts in the cytoplasm as a dynein axonemal assembly factor, interacting with chaperone proteins and other assembly factors to ensure cilia are built correctly. Without this function, cilia may still form structurally but are immotile, leading to symptoms such as chronic respiratory disease, laterality defects, and infertility. The genes DYX1C1 is a candidate genes linked to dyslexia, and their primary shared function is in neuronal migration during brain development. This means they help guide neurons to their correct positions in the developing neocortex, which is essential for proper brain organisation and function. Specifically, DYX1C1 is required for neurons to transition out of an early “multipolar” stage and move to their final locations; its C-terminal region is critical for this role. In addition to its role in the brain, DYX1C1 also has a separate function in cilia biology, where it helps assemble dynein arms needed for ciliary movement.

A key finding is that DYX1C1 is not only linked to neuronal migration and dyslexia risk, but also plays an important role in the formation and function of motile cilia, which are structures responsible for moving fluids in the brain, airways, and developing embryo. The study shows that DYX1C1 interacts with other cilia-related proteins (such as CPAP and DCDC2) and is involved in cytoplasmic processes that help assemble dynein motor arms required for ciliary movement. When this gene is disrupted, it leads to defects in ciliary motility, causing developmental issues such as abnormal left-right body patterning, hydrocephalus, and impaired fluid flow. Overall, the function of DYX1C1 is best described as a regulator of cilia assembly and activity, linking cellular structural machinery to both neurological development and broader developmental biology.

== Clinical significance ==
A mutation in the DYX1C1 gene has been associated with deficits in reading ability (dyslexia).

== Testing ==
Testing DYX1C1 not only if the protein is functional in case so testing the most effective approaches for testing the role of DYX1C1 because it combines a family-based genetic design with precise cognitive measurements and robust statistical analysis. By using nuclear families with a diagnosed dyslexic proband, the researchers reduce population stratification bias and ensure that genetic transmission patterns are accurately captured. The use of direct DNA sequencing for key DYX1C1 markers (−3GA and 1249GT) strengthens the reliability of variant detection.
