= ANAPC4 =

Protein-coding gene in the species Homo sapiens

Identifiers
- Aliases: ANAPC4, APC4, anaphase promoting complex subunit 4
- External IDs: OMIM: 606947; MGI: 1098673; GeneCards: ANAPC4
Available structures
PDB	Ortholog search: PDBe RCSB
PDB	List of PDB id codes 4UI9, 5BPW, 5A31, 5G05, 5G04

Gene location (Human)
Chr.	Chromosome 4 (human)
Band	4p15.2	Start	25,377,263 bp
Band	4p15.2	End	25,418,498 bp

Gene location (Mouse)
Chr.	Chromosome 5 (mouse)
Band	5 C1|5 28.81 cM	Start	52,991,354 bp
Band	5 C1|5 28.81 cM	End	53,025,139 bp
RNA expression pattern
Bgee	Human / Mouse (ortholog); Top expressed in: right uterine tube; endometrium; tendon of biceps brachii; germinal epithelium; bronchial epithelial cell; parietal pleura; visceral pleura; Brodmann area 23; thymus; tibia / Top expressed in: primary oocyte; neural layer of retina; superior cervical ganglion; ventricular zone; pituitary gland; vas deferens; ganglionic eminence; limb bud; fossa; condyle; More reference expression data
BioGPS	n/a
Gene ontology
Molecular function	ubiquitin-protein transferase activity; protein phosphatase binding; protein binding; ubiquitin protein ligase activity
Cellular component	anaphase-promoting complex; cytosol; nucleus; nucleoplasm; nuclear periphery
Biological process	anaphase-promoting complex-dependent catabolic process; regulation of mitotic metaphase/anaphase transition; cell division; protein K11-linked ubiquitination; cell cycle; protein ubiquitination; positive regulation of mitotic metaphase/anaphase transition; regulation of mitotic cell cycle phase transition; ubiquitin-dependent protein catabolic process
Sources:Amigo / QuickGO
Orthologs
Databases	NCBI: entry; OMA: entry
Species	Human	Mouse
Entrez	29945	52206
Ensembl	ENSG00000053900	ENSMUSG00000029176
UniProt	Q9UJX5	Q91W96
RefSeq (mRNA)	NM_001286756; NM_013367	NM_024213
RefSeq (protein)	NP_001273685; NP_037499	NP_077175
Location (UCSC)	Chr 4: 25.38 – 25.42 Mb	Chr 5: 52.99 – 53.03 Mb
PubMed search
- Wikidata
View/Edit Human	View/Edit Mouse

Anaphase-promoting complex subunit 4 is an enzyme that in humans is encoded by the ANAPC4 gene.

A large protein complex, termed the anaphase-promoting complex (APC), or the cyclosome, promotes metaphase-anaphase transition by ubiquitinating its specific substrates such as mitotic cyclins and anaphase inhibitor, which are subsequently degraded by the 26S proteasome. Biochemical studies have shown that the vertebrate APC contains eight subunits. The composition of the APC is highly conserved in organisms from yeast to humans. The exact function of this gene product is not known.

== Interactions ==
ANAPC4 has been shown to interact with ANAPC1, ANAPC5, CDC27 and ANAPC7.
