= NAA15 =

Protein-coding gene in the species Homo sapiens

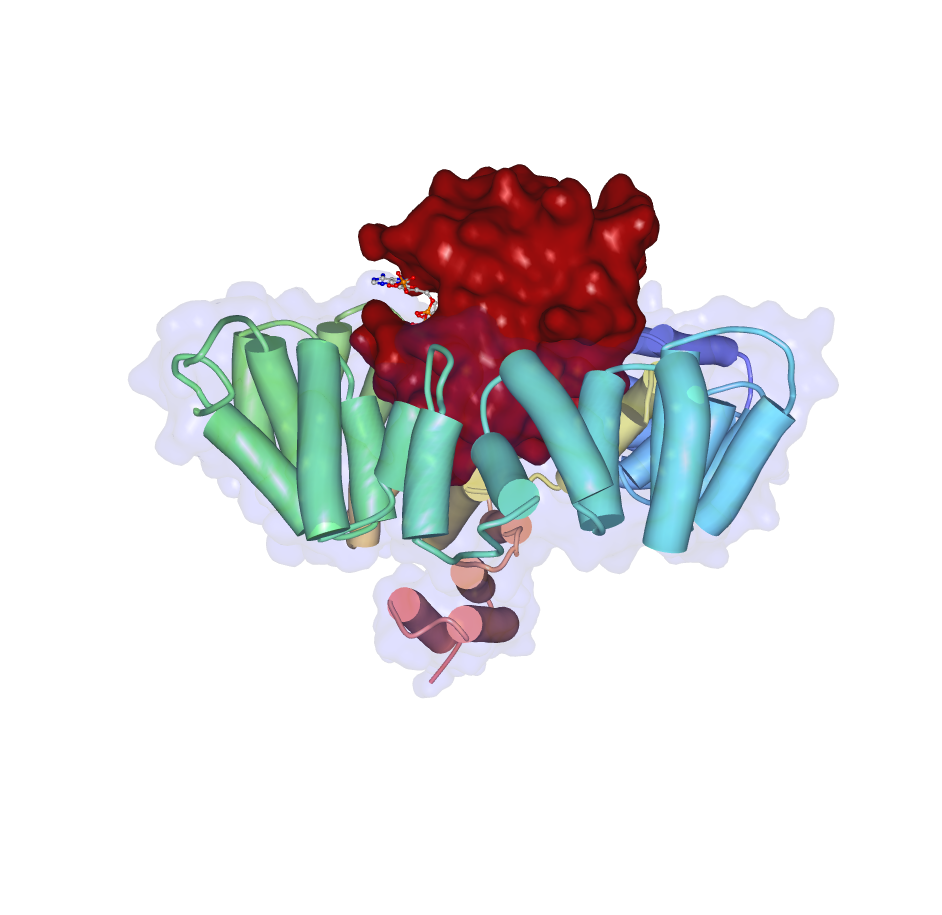

Identifiers
- Aliases: NAA15, Ga19, NARG1, NAT1P, NATH, TBDN, TBDN100, N(alpha)-acetyltransferase 15, NatA auxiliary subunit, MRD50, N-alpha-acetyltransferase 15, NatA auxiliary subunit
- External IDs: OMIM: 608000; MGI: 1922088; GeneCards: NAA15

Gene location (Human)
| Chr. | Chromosome 4 (human) |
| Band | 4q31.1 | Start | 139,301,505 bp |
| Band | 4q31.1 | End | 139,420,033 bp |

Gene location (Mouse)
| Chr. | Chromosome 3 (mouse) |
| Band | 3|3 C | Start | 51,322,569 bp |
| Band | 3|3 C | End | 51,383,928 bp |
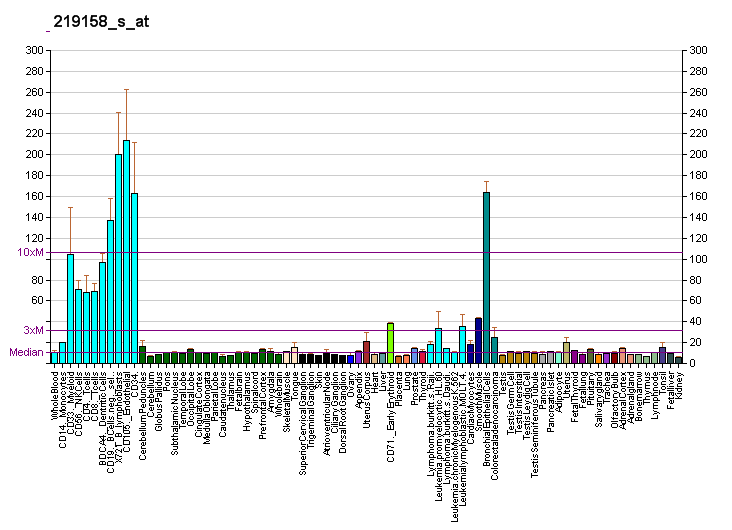
RNA expression pattern
| Bgee | Human / Mouse (ortholog); Top expressed in: Achilles tendon; ventricular zone; pericardium; Skeletal muscle tissue of biceps brachii; mucosa of sigmoid colon; tonsil; secondary oocyte; pylorus; gonad; epithelium of colon / Top expressed in: tail of embryo; epiblast; spermatid; abdominal wall; primitive streak; epithelium of lens; hair follicle; medullary collecting duct; maxillary prominence; ureter; More reference expression data |
| BioGPS | More reference expression data |
Gene ontology
| Molecular function | protein binding; peptide alpha-N-acetyltransferase activity; acetyltransferase activity; ribosome binding; RNA binding |
| Cellular component | NatA complex; transcription regulator complex; nucleus; membrane; cytoplasm; cytosol |
| Biological process | regulation of transcription, DNA-templated; N-terminal peptidyl-methionine acetylation; protein stabilization; multicellular organism development; positive regulation of transcription, DNA-templated; cell differentiation; angiogenesis; negative regulation of apoptotic process; N-terminal protein amino acid acetylation; transcription, DNA-templated |
Sources:Amigo / QuickGO
Orthologs
| Databases | NCBI: entry; OMA: entry |
| Species | Human | Mouse |
| Entrez | 80155 | 74838 |
| Ensembl | ENSG00000164134 | ENSMUSG00000063273 |
| UniProt | Q9BXJ9 | Q80UM3 |
| RefSeq (mRNA) | NM_057175 | NM_053089 |
| RefSeq (protein) | NP_476516 | n/a |
| Location (UCSC) | Chr 4: 139.3 – 139.42 Mb | Chr 3: 51.32 – 51.38 Mb |
| PubMed search |
- Wikidata
| View/Edit Human | View/Edit Mouse |

N-alpha-acetyltransferase 15, NatA auxiliary subunit also known as gastric cancer antigen Ga19 (GA19), NMDA receptor-regulated protein 1 (NARG1), and Tbdn100 is a protein that in humans is encoded by the NAA15 gene. NARG1 is the auxiliary subunit of the NatA (N^{α}-acetyltransferase A) complex. This NatA complex can associate with the ribosome and catalyzes the transfer of an acetyl group to the N^{α}-terminal amino group of proteins as they emerge from the exit tunnel.

== Gene and transcripts ==
Human NAA15 is located on chromosome 4q31.1 and contains 23 exons. Initially, 2 mRNA species were identified, of size 4.6 and 5.8 kb, both harboring the same open reading frame encoding a putative protein of 866 amino acids (~105 kDa) protein that can be detected in most human adult tissues. According to RefSeq/NCBI, only one human transcript variant exists, although 2 more isoforms are predicted. In addition to full length Naa15, an N-terminally truncated variant of Naa15 (named tubedown-1), Naa15_{273-865} has been described; however, in mouse only full length Naa15 is widely expressed, whereas smaller transcripts seem to visualized only in heart and testis.

In addition to this, a NAA15 gene duplication, NAA16, has been identified, and the encoded protein shares 70% sequence identity to hNaa15 and is expressed in a variety of human cell lines, but is generally less abundant as compared to hNaa15. Three isoforms of Naa16 are validated so far (NCBI RefSeq). Mouse NAA15 is located on chromosome 2 D and contains 20 exons, whereas mouse NAA16 is located on chromosome 14 D3 and consists of 21 exons.

In principle, NatA can assemble from all the Naa10 and Naa15 isoforms in human and mouse, creating a more complex and flexible system for Nα-terminal acetylation as compared to lower eukaryotes.

== Structure ==
The X-ray crystal structure of the holo-NatA complex (Naa10/Naa15) from S. pombe revealed that Naa15 is composed of 13 conserved helical bundle tetratricopeptide repeat (TPR) motifs and adopts a ring-like topology that wraps around the catalytic subunit of NatA, Naa10. This interaction induces conformational changes in the catalytic center of Naa10 that allows the acetylation of conventional NatA substrates. The crystal structure of human NatA bound to the protein HYPK has also been solved.

Because TPR motifs mediate protein–protein interactions, it has been postulated that this domain may facilitate the interaction with other NatA-binding partners such as the ribosome and Naa50/NatE. Naa15 harbors a putative NLS between residues 612-628 (KKNAEKEKQQRNQKKKK); however, analysis of the nuclear localization of Naa15 revealed discrepant results.

== Function ==
Naa15, together with its catalytic subunit Naa10, constitutes the evolutionarily conserved NatA (N^{α}-acetyltransferase A) complex, which acetylates the α-amino group of the first amino acid residue of proteins starting with small side chains like serine, glycine, alanine, threonine and cysteine, after the initiator methionine has been cleaved by methionine aminopeptidases.

Both Naa15 and Naa16 interact with the ribosome in yeast (via the ribosomal proteins, uL23 and uL29), humans and rat, thereby linking the NatA/Naa10 to the ribosome and facilitating co-translational acetylation of nascent polypeptide chains as they emerges from the exit tunnel. Furthermore, Naa15 might act as a scaffold for other factors, including the chaperone like protein HYPK (Huntingtin Interacting Protein K) and Naa50, the catalytic acetyltransferase subunit of NatE In S. cerevisiae, NAA15Δ and NAA10Δ knockout cells exhibit the same phenotype, and biochemical data indicate that uncomplexed Naa15 is unstable and gets degraded. Therefore, Naa15 function has been closely linked to the acetyltransferase activity of Naa10 as part of the NatA complex.

NatA may also regulate co-translational protein folding and protein targeting to the endoplasmic reticulum, possibly through competition with SRP and NAC for the same ribosomal binding sites or through yet unknown interference with other ribosome-associated protein biogenesis factors, such as the MetAPs, the chaperones Hsp70/Hsp40, SRP and NAC, which act on newly synthesized proteins as soon as they emerge from the ribosome exit tunnel. However, the exact mechanism of such action is obscure. Apart from this, Naa15 has been linked to many cellular processes, including the maintenance of a healthy retina, endothelial cell permeability, tumor progression, generation and differentiation of neurons apoptosis and transcriptional regulation; however, it is not well understood whether these are NatA-independent or -dependent functions of Naa15.

== Disease ==
Two damaging de novo NAA15 mutations were reported by exome sequencing in parent-offspring trios with congenital heart disease. Patient 1 harbors a frameshift mutation (p. Lys335fs) and displays heterotaxy (dextrocardia, total anomalous pulmonary venous return, left superior vena cava, hypoplastic TV, double outlet right ventricle, hypoplastic RV, D-transposition of the great arteries, pulmonic stenosis) and hydronephrosis, asplenia, malrotation and abnormal neuro-development, the second patient harbors a nonsense mutation (p.S761X) and displays conotruncal defects (tetralogy of Fallot, single left coronary artery).
