= TTC4 =

Protein-coding gene in humans

Identifiers
- Aliases: TTC4, tetratricopeptide repeat domain 4, CNS1
- External IDs: OMIM: 606753; MGI: 1919604; GeneCards: TTC4

Gene location (Human)
Chr.	Chromosome 1 (human)
Band	1p32.3	Start	54,715,861 bp
Band	1p32.3	End	54,742,657 bp

Gene location (Mouse)
Chr.	Chromosome 4 (mouse)
Band	4|4 C7	Start	106,519,453 bp
Band	4|4 C7	End	106,536,141 bp
RNA expression pattern
Bgee	Human / Mouse (ortholog); Top expressed in: gastrocnemius muscle; islet of Langerhans; muscle of thigh; skeletal muscle tissue; C1 segment; pituitary gland; anterior pituitary; testicle; ventricular zone; apex of heart / Top expressed in: spermatocyte; spermatid; neural layer of retina; seminiferous tubule; ventricular zone; neural tube; muscle of thigh; right kidney; superior frontal gyrus; cerebellar cortex; More reference expression data
BioGPS	n/a
Orthologs
Databases	NCBI: entry; OMA: entry
Species	Human	Mouse
Entrez	7268	72354
Ensembl	ENSG00000243725	ENSMUSG00000025413
UniProt	O95801	Q8R3H9
RefSeq (mRNA)	NM_004623; NM_001291333	NM_001172073; NM_028209
RefSeq (protein)	NP_001278262; NP_004614	NP_001165544; NP_082485
Location (UCSC)	Chr 1: 54.72 – 54.74 Mb	Chr 4: 106.52 – 106.54 Mb
PubMed search
- Wikidata
View/Edit Human	View/Edit Mouse

Tetratricopeptide repeat protein 4 is a protein that in humans is encoded by the TTC4 gene.

The 34-amino acid tetratricopeptide repeat (TPR) motif is found in a variety of proteins and may mediate protein-protein or protein-membrane interactions.[supplied by OMIM]
