= TTC28 =

Protein-coding gene in the species Homo sapiens

Identifiers
- Aliases: TTC28, TPRBK, tetratricopeptide repeat domain 28
- External IDs: OMIM: 615098; MGI: 2140873; GeneCards: TTC28

Gene location (Human)
Chr.	Chromosome 22 (human)
Band	22q12.1	Start	27,978,014 bp
Band	22q12.1	End	28,679,840 bp

Gene location (Mouse)
Chr.	Chromosome 5 (mouse)
Band	5|5 F	Start	111,027,669 bp
Band	5|5 F	End	111,437,646 bp
RNA expression pattern
Bgee	Human / Mouse (ortholog); Top expressed in: ganglionic eminence; corpus epididymis; synovial joint; tibia; secondary oocyte; urethra; germinal epithelium; parietal pleura; visceral pleura; parotid gland / Top expressed in: Rostral migratory stream; saccule; epithelium of lens; human fetus; ganglionic eminence; otic vesicle; internal carotid artery; external carotid artery; otic placode; lacrimal gland; More reference expression data
BioGPS	n/a
Gene ontology
Molecular function	kinase binding
Cellular component	cytoplasm; microtubule organizing center; spindle; spindle pole; cytoskeleton; midbody; mitotic spindle
Biological process	cell cycle; cell division; regulation of mitotic cell cycle
Sources:Amigo / QuickGO
Orthologs
Databases	NCBI: entry; OMA: entry
Species	Human	Mouse
Entrez	23331	209683
Ensembl	ENSG00000100154	ENSMUSG00000033209
UniProt	Q96AY4	Q80XJ3
RefSeq (mRNA)	NM_001145418; NM_015281; NM_001393403; NM_001393404; NM_001393405	NM_001267622; NM_024477
RefSeq (protein)	NP_001138890	NP_001254551
Location (UCSC)	Chr 22: 27.98 – 28.68 Mb	Chr 5: 111.03 – 111.44 Mb
PubMed search
- Wikidata
View/Edit Human	View/Edit Mouse

Tetratricopeptide repeat domain 28 is a protein that in humans is encoded by the TTC28 gene.
