= TMTC4 =

Protein-coding gene in the species Homo sapiens

Identifiers
- Aliases: TMTC4, transmembrane and tetratricopeptide repeat containing 4, transmembrane O-mannosyltransferase targeting cadherins 4
- External IDs: OMIM: 618203; MGI: 1921050; GeneCards: TMTC4
Enzyme activity
EC #	BRENDA	ExPASy	KEGG	MetaCyc
2.4.1.109	↗	↗	↗	↗

Gene location (Human)
Chr.	Chromosome 13 (human)
Band	13q32.3	Start	100,603,625 bp
Band	13q32.3	End	100,675,093 bp

Gene location (Mouse)
Chr.	Chromosome 14 (mouse)
Band	14|14 E5	Start	122,918,971 bp
Band	14|14 E5	End	122,984,035 bp
RNA expression pattern
Bgee	Human / Mouse (ortholog); Top expressed in: corpus callosum; ventricular zone; ganglionic eminence; C1 segment; pancreatic epithelial cell; mucosa of ileum; gonad; endothelial cell; inferior ganglion of vagus nerve; Brodmann area 46 / Top expressed in: barrel cortex; vas deferens; medial ganglionic eminence; trigeminal ganglion; vestibular sensory epithelium; superior cervical ganglion; olfactory epithelium; lacrimal gland; condyle; seminal vesicula; More reference expression data
BioGPS	n/a
Gene ontology
Molecular function	mannosyltransferase activity; dolichyl-phosphate-mannose-protein mannosyltransferase activity; transferase activity
Cellular component	membrane; integral component of membrane; endoplasmic reticulum
Biological process	protein O-linked mannosylation; protein glycosylation
Sources:Amigo / QuickGO
Orthologs
Databases	NCBI: entry; OMA: entry
Species	Human	Mouse
Entrez	84899	70551
Ensembl	ENSG00000125247	ENSMUSG00000041594
UniProt	Q5T4D3	Q8BG19
RefSeq (mRNA)	NM_001079669; NM_001286453; NM_032813; NM_001350571; NM_001350572 NM_001350574; NM_001350576; NM_001350577	NM_028651; NM_001360598; NM_001360599
RefSeq (protein)	NP_001073137; NP_001273382; NP_116202; NP_001337500; NP_001337501 NP_001337503; NP_001337505; NP_001337506	NP_082927; NP_001347527; NP_001347528
Location (UCSC)	Chr 13: 100.6 – 100.68 Mb	Chr 14: 122.92 – 122.98 Mb
PubMed search
- Wikidata
View/Edit Human	View/Edit Mouse

Transmembrane and Tetratricopeptide repeat containing 4 is a protein that in humans is encoded by the TMTC4 gene. This protein crosses the plasma membrane 10 times, and resides in the ER lumen and cytosol. The predicted structure of the TMTC4 protein is a series of alpha-helices.

== Gene ==
TMTC4 is located on chromosome 13 at 13q32.3. The gene is flanked by ADP ribosylation factor 4 pseudogene 3 (ARF4P3) on the left, and ribosomal protein S26 pseudogene 47 (RPS26P47) on the right. TMTC4 spans 4043 bp and has a total of 23 exons.

== mRNA ==
TMTC4 has seven isoform variants, the most common being isoform 1 at 4043 bp.

Isoform	Length (bp)
1	4043
2	3833
3	3500
4	4217
5	4120
6	4037
7	3827

The 5’ UTR for TMTC4 is short and in many of the shorter isoforms, portions of this untranslated region are cut. In comparison, the 3’ UTR is long and is often complete across the seven isoforms.

== Protein ==
=== Physical properties ===
The molecular weight for TMTC4 is 85.0 kdal, and there are no positive, negative, or neutral clusters of amino acids or charge runs exceeding the normal lengths. When looking at a distant ortholog (purple sea urchin) the molecular weight of TMTC4 is 85.5 kdal and there, again, are no charge runs, positive, negative or neutral clusters, or unusual spacings. There are strong similarities in protein composition across species. The isoelectric point for the domain of unknown function (DUF 1736) is lower than that of the protein overall.

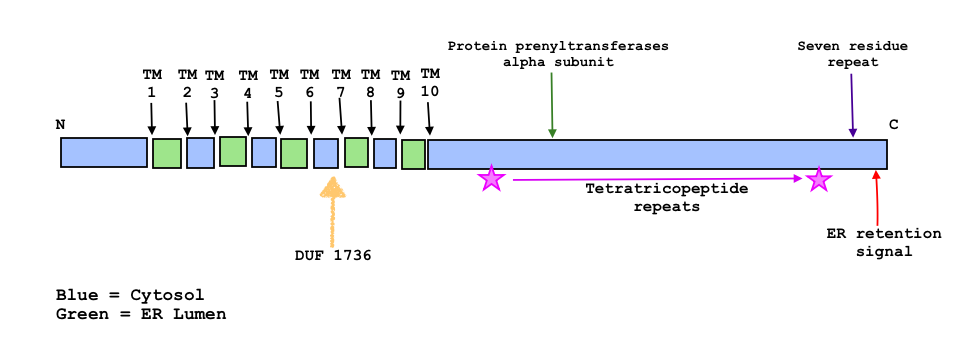
Schematic illustration of known and predicted domains and motifs for TMTC4

Domain	Amino Acids	Molecular Weight (kdal)	Isoelectric Point
Human TMTC4	760	85.0	9.135
DUF 1736	75	8.6	4.123
TPR repeats	234	26.7	9.509

=== Domains ===
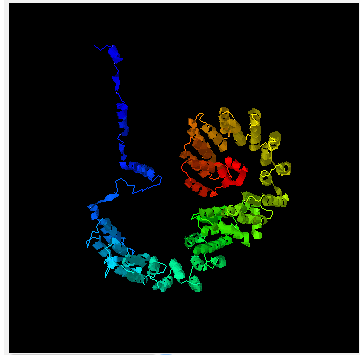
Predicted secondary structure of TMTC4. Starting at blue and going to red, the diagram illustrates the n-terminus through the c-terminus.

TMTC4 has ten transmembrane regions, all of them spaced within the first half of the protein.

TMTC4 is layered with tetratricopeptide (TPR) repeat sequences that are a part of the TPR superfamily of proteins. DUF1736 is present upstream of the TPR region. A seven residue repeat (SRR) is located toward the end of the protein, and it is thought to encode a coiled-coil structure. Another member of the TPR family, PFTA (protein prenyltransferases alpha subunit repeat), is located within the protein's TPR region and is believed to be involved in signal transduction and vesicular traffic regulation. LSPR coagulation factor V, also a repeat motif, is located within the TPR region, and is thought to be a central regulator of hemostasis.

=== Secondary structure ===
TMTC4 takes on a series of alpha-helix structures, especially within the TPR region, though there are a minimal amount of beta-strand structures spaced throughout the beginning half of the protein.

=== Post-translational modifications ===
Predicted post-translational modifications of TMTC4 protein

There are four predicted nuclear localization signals, each tagging the protein for nuclear import. At the very end of the protein, however, there is a predicted ER retention signal which would prevent the protein from leaving the ER. The protein has three predicted N-glycosylation sites, potentially altering its structure and function and there are ten predicted phosphorylation sites, each a possible activation site for a regulatory mechanism.

== Expression ==
TMTC4 is expressed in all human tissues. The gene, however, is most highly expressed in the brain and in the spinal cord.

Protein abundance seems to be lower than normal for TMTC4.

=== Regulation ===
There is one possible promoter for the TMTC4 gene, located in the 5’ UTR but before the start of the coding sequence.

== Function ==
Currently the function of TMTC4 has not been characterized.

== Interacting proteins ==
Possible interacting proteins are NRG1, PEX19, HERC3, TXNDC15, and COL1A1 . All of these were detected through affinity chromatography.

Protein Name	Known function	Location
Neuregulin 1 [NRG1]	mediates cell to cell signaling	membrane glycoprotein
Peroxisomal Biogenesis Factor 19 [PEX19]	cytosolic chaperone	membrane receptor protein
ECT And RLD Domain Containing E3 Ubiquitin Protein Ligase 3 [HERC3]	member of the ubiquitin ligase family	cytosol
Thioredoxin Domain Containing 15 [TXNDC15]	Not known	Not known
Collagen Type I Alpha 1 Chain [COL1A1]	triple helix collagen protein	extracellular

== Homology ==
=== Orthologs ===
Ortholog space for TMTC4 spans a large portion of evolutionary time. TMTC4 is present in mammals, reptiles, amphibians, birds, fish, and invertebrates. It is not present in plants, bacteria, archaea, or fungi.

Sequence Number	Genus and species	Common name	Accession # (protein)	Identity	Date of Divergence (MYA)
1	Heterocephalus glaber	Naked mole rat	EHB03258.1	88%	94
2	Rattus norvegicus	Brown rat	NP_001127886.1	90%	94
3	Myotis brandtii	Brandt's bat	EPQ01527.1	90%	94
4	Pteropus alecto	Black flying fox	XP_006909447.1	93%	88
5	Erinaceus europaeus	European hedgehog	XP_016040457.1	85%	94
6	Sorex araneus	Common shrew	XP_004614101.1	86%	94
7	Sus scrofa	Wild boar	NP_001239134.1	91%	94
8	Lipotes vexillifer	Baiji	XP_007461591.1	90%	88
9	Ailuropoda melanoleuca	Giant panda	XP_019650336.1	90%	94
10	Acinonyx jubatus	Cheetah	XP_014931490.1	93%	94
11	Tyto alba	Barn owl	KFV56414.1	85%	320
12	Charadrius vociferus	Killdeer	KGL87053.1	84%	320
13	Python bivittatus	Burmese python	XP_007425712.1	81%	320
14	Anolis carolinensis	Carolina anole	XP_008105174.1	82%	320
15	Xenopus tropicalis	Western clawed frog	NP_001121486.1	38%	353
16	Nanorana parkeri	Nanorana parkeri	XP_018432106.1	73%	353
17	Callorhinchus milii	Australian ghostshark	XP_007885231.1	68%	465
18	Crassostrea gigas	Pacific oyster	XP_011422949.1	50%	758
19	Strongylocentrotus purpuratus	Purple sea urchin	XP_011670776.1	49%	627

=== Paralogs ===
Paralog space for TMTC4 spans the gene family TMTC. There are four genes in this gene family: TMTC1, TMTC2, TMTC3, and TMTC4. TMTC1 and TMTC3 split from TMTC4 about 1200 million years ago, while TMTC2 split from TMTC4 1400 million years ago. Both of these events happened somewhere between invertebrates and plants.
