= ANAPC1 =

Protein-coding gene in humans

Identifiers
- Aliases: ANAPC1, APC1, MCPR, TSG24, anaphase promoting complex subunit 1
- External IDs: OMIM: 608473; MGI: 103097; GeneCards: ANAPC1
Available structures
PDB	Ortholog search: PDBe RCSB
PDB	List of PDB id codes 4UI9, 5A31, 5G04, 5G05

Gene location (Human)
Chr.	Chromosome 2 (human)
Band	2q13	Start	111,611,639 bp
Band	2q13	End	111,884,690 bp

Gene location (Mouse)
Chr.	Chromosome 2 (mouse)
Band	2|2 F1	Start	128,452,024 bp
Band	2|2 F1	End	128,529,311 bp
RNA expression pattern
Bgee	Human / Mouse (ortholog); Top expressed in: gonad; epithelium of colon; pancreatic ductal cell; Achilles tendon; testicle; tibialis anterior muscle; endothelial cell; bone marrow cell; deltoid muscle; ventricular zone / Top expressed in: Gonadal ridge; tail of embryo; somite; genital tubercle; mandibular prominence; epiblast; endothelial cell of lymphatic vessel; primitive streak; maxillary prominence; ventricular zone; More reference expression data
BioGPS	n/a
Gene ontology
Molecular function	ubiquitin protein ligase activity
Cellular component	nucleoplasm; cytosol; anaphase-promoting complex; nucleus
Biological process	cell cycle; anaphase-promoting complex-dependent catabolic process; protein ubiquitination; protein K11-linked ubiquitination; cell division; metaphase; regulation of mitotic cell cycle phase transition; ubiquitin-dependent protein catabolic process
Sources:Amigo / QuickGO
Orthologs
Databases	NCBI: entry; OMA: entry
Species	Human	Mouse
Entrez	64682	17222
Ensembl	ENSG00000153107	ENSMUSG00000014355
UniProt	Q9H1A4	P53995
RefSeq (mRNA)	NM_022662	NM_008569
RefSeq (protein)	NP_073153	NP_032595
Location (UCSC)	Chr 2: 111.61 – 111.88 Mb	Chr 2: 128.45 – 128.53 Mb
PubMed search
- Wikidata
View/Edit Human	View/Edit Mouse

Anaphase-promoting complex subunit 1 is an enzyme that in humans is encoded by the ANAPC1 gene.

ANAPC1 is one of at least ten subunits of the anaphase-promoting complex (APC), which functions at the metaphase-to-anaphase transition of the cell cycle and is regulated by spindle checkpoint proteins. The APC is an E3 ubiquitin ligase that targets cell cycle regulatory proteins for degradation by the proteasome, thereby allowing progression through the cell cycle (supplied by OMIM).

== Interactions ==
ANAPC1 has been shown to interact with ANAPC5, ANAPC4, ANAPC2, CDC27 and ANAPC7.
