= ANAPC10 =

Protein-coding gene in the species Homo sapiens

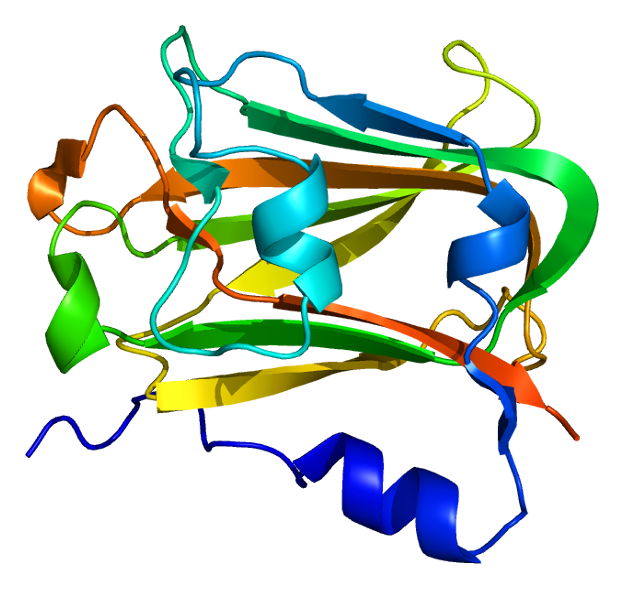

Identifiers
- Aliases: ANAPC10, APC10, DOC1, anaphase promoting complex subunit 10
- External IDs: OMIM: 613745; MGI: 1916249; GeneCards: ANAPC10
Available structures
PDB	Ortholog search: PDBe RCSB
PDB	List of PDB id codes 1JHJ, 4UI9, 5A31, 5G05, 5G04

Gene location (Human)
Chr.	Chromosome 4 (human)
Band	4q31.21	Start	144,831,908 bp
Band	4q31.21	End	145,098,541 bp

Gene location (Mouse)
Chr.	Chromosome 8 (mouse)
Band	8 C1|8 37.79 cM	Start	80,438,449 bp
Band	8 C1|8 37.79 cM	End	80,505,688 bp
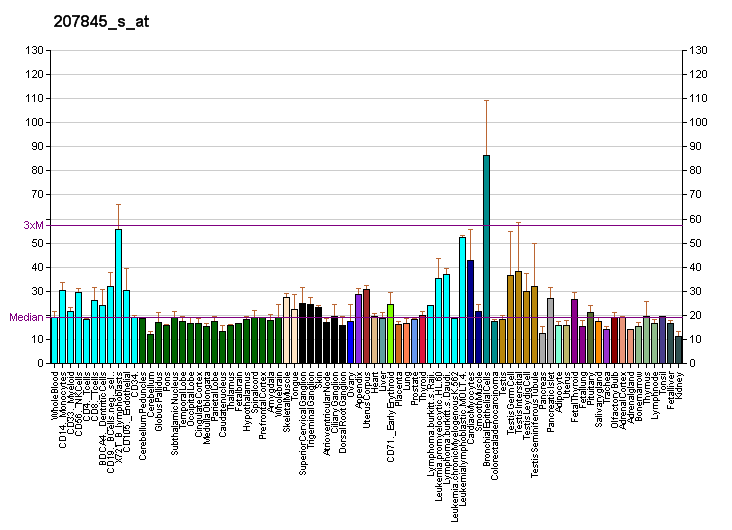
RNA expression pattern
Bgee	Human / Mouse (ortholog); Top expressed in: oocyte; Achilles tendon; secondary oocyte; gonad; ventricular zone; ganglionic eminence; tibial arteries; right testis; left testis; gastrocnemius muscle / Top expressed in: hand; medial ganglionic eminence; morula; blastocyst; seminiferous tubule; superior cervical ganglion; abdominal wall; vas deferens; atrioventricular valve; mandibular prominence; More reference expression data
BioGPS	More reference expression data
Gene ontology
Molecular function	ubiquitin protein ligase activity
Cellular component	cytoplasm; nucleoplasm; cytosol; anaphase-promoting complex
Biological process	cell cycle; protein ubiquitination; protein K11-linked ubiquitination; cell division; anaphase-promoting complex-dependent catabolic process; positive regulation of ubiquitin protein ligase activity; regulation of mitotic cell cycle phase transition; ubiquitin-dependent protein catabolic process
Sources:Amigo / QuickGO
Orthologs
Databases	NCBI: entry; OMA: entry
Species	Human	Mouse
Entrez	10393	68999
Ensembl	ENSG00000164162	ENSMUSG00000036977
UniProt	Q9UM13	Q8K2H6
RefSeq (mRNA)	NM_001256706; NM_001256707; NM_001256708; NM_001256709; NM_001256710 NM_001256711; NM_001256712; NM_014885; NM_001318367	NM_026904; NM_001357234; NM_001357235; NM_001357236; NM_001357237
RefSeq (protein)	NP_001243635; NP_001243636; NP_001243637; NP_001243638; NP_001243639 NP_001243640; NP_001243641; NP_001305296; NP_055700	NP_081180; NP_001344163; NP_001344164; NP_001344165; NP_001344166
Location (UCSC)	Chr 4: 144.83 – 145.1 Mb	Chr 8: 80.44 – 80.51 Mb
PubMed search
- Wikidata
View/Edit Human	View/Edit Mouse

Anaphase-promoting complex subunit 10 is an enzyme that in humans is encoded by the ANAPC10 gene.

== Interactions ==
ANAPC10 has been shown to interact with CDC27, Mothers against decapentaplegic homolog 3 and Mothers against decapentaplegic homolog 2.
