= ANAPC7 =

Protein-coding gene in humans

Identifiers
- Aliases: ANAPC7, APC7, anaphase promoting complex subunit 7, FERBON
- External IDs: OMIM: 606949; MGI: 1929711; GeneCards: ANAPC7
Available structures
PDB	Ortholog search: PDBe RCSB
PDB	List of PDB id codes 3FFL, 4UI9, 5A31, 5G04, 5G05

Gene location (Human)
Chr.	Chromosome 12 (human)
Band	12q24.11	Start	110,372,900 bp
Band	12q24.11	End	110,403,730 bp

Gene location (Mouse)
Chr.	Chromosome 5 (mouse)
Band	5|5 F	Start	122,559,756 bp
Band	5|5 F	End	122,582,975 bp
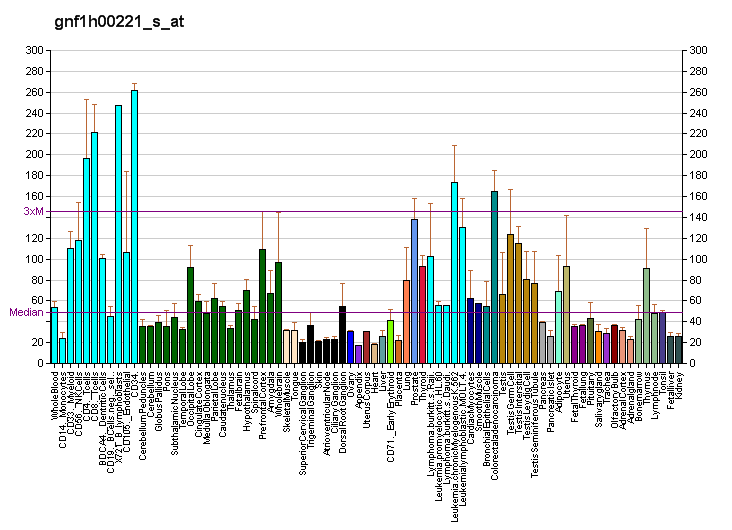

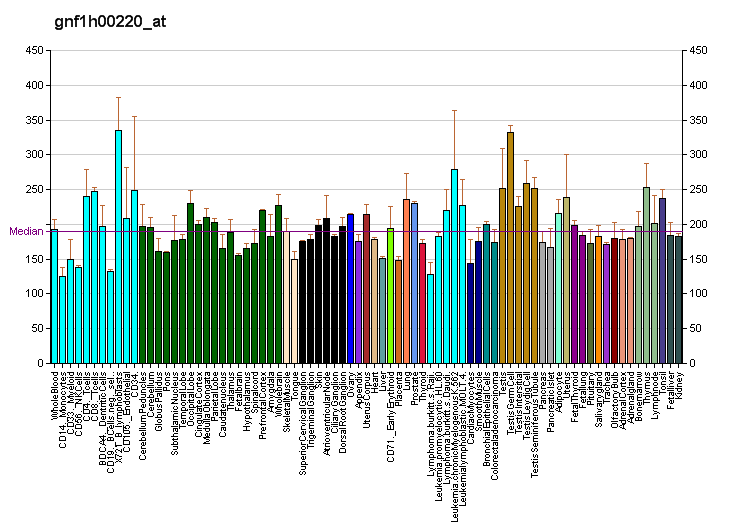

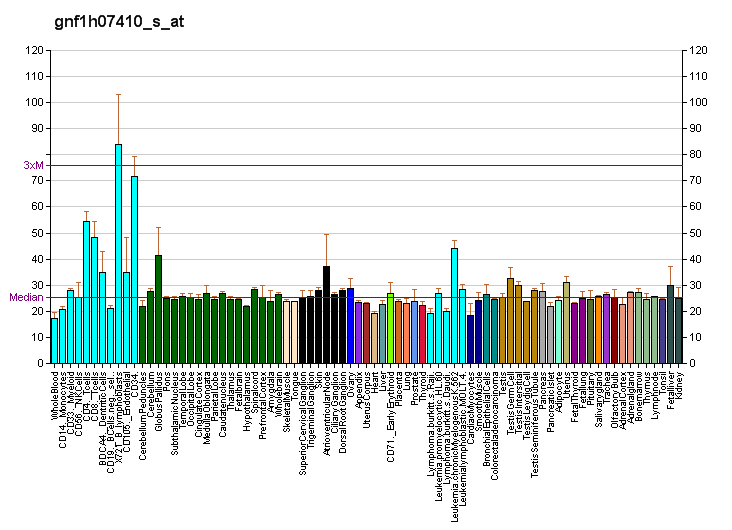
RNA expression pattern
Bgee	Human / Mouse (ortholog); Top expressed in: pancreatic ductal cell; mucosa of esophagus; skin of arm; right testis; left testis; gonad; cerebellar hemisphere; right hemisphere of cerebellum; right uterine tube; vagina / Top expressed in: otic vesicle; saccule; otic placode; interventricular septum; external carotid artery; internal carotid artery; tunica media of zone of aorta; medullary collecting duct; epithelium of lens; trigeminal ganglion; More reference expression data
BioGPS	More reference expression data
Gene ontology
Molecular function	protein phosphatase binding; protein binding
Cellular component	nucleoplasm; cytosol; anaphase-promoting complex; nucleus
Biological process	cell cycle; anaphase-promoting complex-dependent catabolic process; protein ubiquitination; protein K11-linked ubiquitination; cell division; regulation of mitotic cell cycle phase transition; ubiquitin-dependent protein catabolic process
Sources:Amigo / QuickGO
Orthologs
Databases	NCBI: entry; OMA: entry
Species	Human	Mouse
Entrez	51434	56317
Ensembl	ENSG00000196510	ENSMUSG00000029466
UniProt	Q9UJX3	Q9WVM3
RefSeq (mRNA)	NM_001137664; NM_016238; NM_001385208; NM_001385209; NM_001385210 NM_001385211; NM_001385212	NM_019805
RefSeq (protein)	NP_001131136; NP_057322; NP_057322.2	NP_062779
Location (UCSC)	Chr 12: 110.37 – 110.4 Mb	Chr 5: 122.56 – 122.58 Mb
PubMed search
- Wikidata
View/Edit Human	View/Edit Mouse

Anaphase-promoting complex subunit 7 is an enzyme that in humans is encoded by the ANAPC7 gene. Multiple transcript variants encoding different isoforms have been found for this gene.

== Function ==
This gene encodes a tetratricopeptide repeat containing component of the anaphase-promoting complex/cyclosome (APC/C), a large E3 ubiquitin ligase that controls cell cycle progression by targeting a number of cell cycle regulators such as B-type cyclins for 26S proteasome-mediated degradation through ubiquitination. The encoded protein is required for proper protein ubiquitination function of APC/C and for the interaction of APC/C with certain transcription coactivators.

== Interactions ==
ANAPC7 has been shown to interact with ANAPC1, ANAPC4, CDC27 and CDC20.
