= ODAD4 =

Protein-coding gene in the species Homo sapiens

Identifiers
- Aliases: ODAD4, tetratricopeptide repeat domain 25, TTC25, outer dynein arm docking complex subunit 4
- External IDs: OMIM: 617095; MGI: 1921657; GeneCards: ODAD4

Gene location (Human)
Chr.	Chromosome 17 (human)
Band	17q21.2	Start	41,930,617 bp
Band	17q21.2	End	41,966,503 bp

Gene location (Mouse)
Chr.	Chromosome 11 (mouse)
Band	11|11 D	Start	100,436,433 bp
Band	11|11 D	End	100,463,394 bp
RNA expression pattern
Bgee	Human / Mouse (ortholog); Top expressed in: right uterine tube; bronchial epithelial cell; sperm; pancreatic ductal cell; left testis; right testis; olfactory zone of nasal mucosa; mucosa of paranasal sinus; endothelial cell; tendon of biceps brachii / Top expressed in: seminiferous tubule; spermatid; spermatocyte; otolith organ; utricle; olfactory epithelium; Epithelium of choroid plexus; neural layer of retina; salivary gland; morula; More reference expression data
BioGPS	n/a
Orthologs
Databases	NCBI: entry; OMA: entry
Species	Human	Mouse
Entrez	83538	74407
Ensembl	ENSG00000204815	ENSMUSG00000006784
UniProt	Q96NG3	Q9D4B2
RefSeq (mRNA)	NM_031421; NM_001350319	NM_028918; NM_001363174
RefSeq (protein)	NP_113609; NP_001337248	NP_083194; NP_001350103
Location (UCSC)	Chr 17: 41.93 – 41.97 Mb	Chr 11: 100.44 – 100.46 Mb
PubMed search
- Wikidata
View/Edit Human	View/Edit Mouse

Outer dynein arm-docking complex subunit 4 is a protein that in humans is encoded by the ODAD4 gene (previously TTC25). This protein is part of a protein complex that is involved in the docking of the outer dynein arm to cilia. Pathogenic mutations are associated with the disorder primary ciliary dyskinesia 35.
