= CDC27 =

Protein-coding gene in humans

Identifiers
- Aliases: CDC27, ANAPC3, APC3, CDC27Hs, D0S1430E, D17S978E, H-NUC, HNUC, NUC2, cell division cycle 27
- External IDs: OMIM: 116946; MGI: 102685; GeneCards: CDC27
Available structures
PDB	Ortholog search: PDBe RCSB
PDB	List of PDB id codes 3T1N, 4RG6, 4RG7, 4RG9, 4UI9, 5A31, 5G04, 5G05

Gene location (Human)
Chr.	Chromosome 17 (human)
Band	17q21.32	Start	47,117,703 bp
Band	17q21.32	End	47,189,422 bp

Gene location (Mouse)
Chr.	Chromosome 11 (mouse)
Band	11 E1|11 67.79 cM	Start	104,502,745 bp
Band	11 E1|11 67.79 cM	End	104,550,620 bp
RNA expression pattern
Bgee	Human / Mouse (ortholog); Top expressed in: secondary oocyte; buccal mucosa cell; tibia; Achilles tendon; epithelium of colon; Brodmann area 23; tendon of biceps brachii; internal globus pallidus; stromal cell of endometrium; germinal epithelium / Top expressed in: genital tubercle; tail of embryo; zygote; cumulus cell; secondary oocyte; mandibular prominence; maxillary prominence; renal corpuscle; pineal gland; human fetus; More reference expression data
BioGPS	n/a
Gene ontology
Molecular function	protein phosphatase binding; protein binding
Cellular component	cytoplasm; cytosol; centrosome; spindle; spindle microtubule; anaphase-promoting complex; nucleus; nucleoplasm
Biological process	metaphase; anaphase-promoting complex-dependent catabolic process; cell population proliferation; protein ubiquitination; protein K11-linked ubiquitination; regulation of mitotic cell cycle phase transition; ubiquitin-dependent protein catabolic process
Sources:Amigo / QuickGO
Orthologs
Databases	NCBI: entry; OMA: entry
Species	Human	Mouse
Entrez	996	217232
Ensembl	ENSG00000004897	ENSMUSG00000020687
UniProt	P30260	A2A6Q5
RefSeq (mRNA)	NM_001114091; NM_001256; NM_001293089; NM_001293091; NM_001353035 NM_001353047; NM_001353049; NM_001353050; NM_001353051	NM_001285988; NM_001285989; NM_001285990; NM_145436
RefSeq (protein)	NP_001107563; NP_001247; NP_001280018; NP_001280020; NP_001339964 NP_001339976; NP_001339978; NP_001339979; NP_001339980	NP_001272917; NP_001272918; NP_001272919; NP_663411
Location (UCSC)	Chr 17: 47.12 – 47.19 Mb	Chr 11: 104.5 – 104.55 Mb
PubMed search
- Wikidata
View/Edit Human	View/Edit Mouse

Cell division cycle protein 27 homolog is a protein that in humans is encoded by the CDC27 gene.

== Function ==
The protein encoded by this gene shares strong similarity with Saccharomyces cerevisiae protein Cdc27, and the gene product of Schizosaccharomyces pombe nuc 2. This protein is a component of anaphase-promoting complex (APC), which is composed of eight protein subunits and highly conserved in eucaryotic cells. APC catalyzes the formation of cyclin B-ubiquitin conjugate that is responsible for the ubiquitin-mediated proteolysis of B-type cyclins. This protein and 3 other members of the APC complex contain the TPR (tetratricopeptide repeat), a protein domain important for protein-protein interaction. This protein was shown to interact with mitotic checkpoint proteins including Mad2, p55CDC and BUBR1, and thus may be involved in controlling the timing of mitosis.

== Interactions ==
CDC27 has been shown to interact with:

- ANAPC10,
- ANAPC11,
- ANAPC1,
- ANAPC4,
- ANAPC5,
- ANAPC7,
- CDC16,
- CDC20,
- CDC23,
- CDH1,
- FZR1,
- MAD2L1 and
- PIN1.
