= Transmembrane and tetratricopeptide repeat containing 1 =

Protein-coding gene in the species Homo sapiens

TMTC1

Identifiers
- Aliases: TMTC1, OLF, TMTC1A, ARG99, transmembrane and tetratricopeptide repeat containing 1, transmembrane O-mannosyltransferase targeting cadherins 1
- External IDs: OMIM: 615855; MGI: 3039590; GeneCards: TMTC1
Enzyme activity
EC #	BRENDA	ExPASy	KEGG	MetaCyc
2.4.1.109	↗	↗	↗	↗

Gene location (Human)
Chr.	Chromosome 12 (human)
Band	12p11.22	Start	29,500,840 bp
Band	12p11.22	End	29,784,759 bp

Gene location (Mouse)
Chr.	Chromosome 6 (mouse)
Band	6|6 G3	Start	148,133,928 bp
Band	6|6 G3	End	148,345,887 bp
RNA expression pattern
Bgee	Human / Mouse (ortholog); Top expressed in: spinal ganglia; lateral nuclear group of thalamus; trigeminal ganglion; endothelial cell; external globus pallidus; pericardium; myocardium of left ventricle; deltoid muscle; lactiferous duct; synovial membrane / Top expressed in: secondary oocyte; zygote; interventricular septum; aortic valve; triceps brachii muscle; ascending aorta; sternocleidomastoid muscle; temporal muscle; vastus lateralis muscle; primary oocyte; More reference expression data
BioGPS	n/a
Gene ontology
Molecular function	mannosyltransferase activity; dolichyl-phosphate-mannose-protein mannosyltransferase activity; transferase activity
Cellular component	membrane; integral component of membrane; endoplasmic reticulum
Biological process	RNA processing; protein O-linked mannosylation; protein glycosylation
Sources:Amigo / QuickGO
Orthologs
Databases	NCBI: entry; OMA: entry
Species	Human	Mouse
Entrez	83857	387314
Ensembl	ENSG00000133687	ENSMUSG00000030306
UniProt	Q8IUR5	Q3UV71
RefSeq (mRNA)	NM_001193451; NM_175861; NM_001367875; NM_031920	NM_198967; NM_001347518
RefSeq (protein)	NP_001180380; NP_787057; NP_001354804	NP_001334447; NP_945318
Location (UCSC)	Chr 12: 29.5 – 29.78 Mb	Chr 6: 148.13 – 148.35 Mb
PubMed search
- Wikidata
View/Edit Human	View/Edit Mouse

Transmembrane and tetratricopeptide repeat containing 1 is a protein that in humans is encoded by the TMTC1 gene.
