= Neutrophil cytosolic factor 2 =

Protein found in humans

NCF2
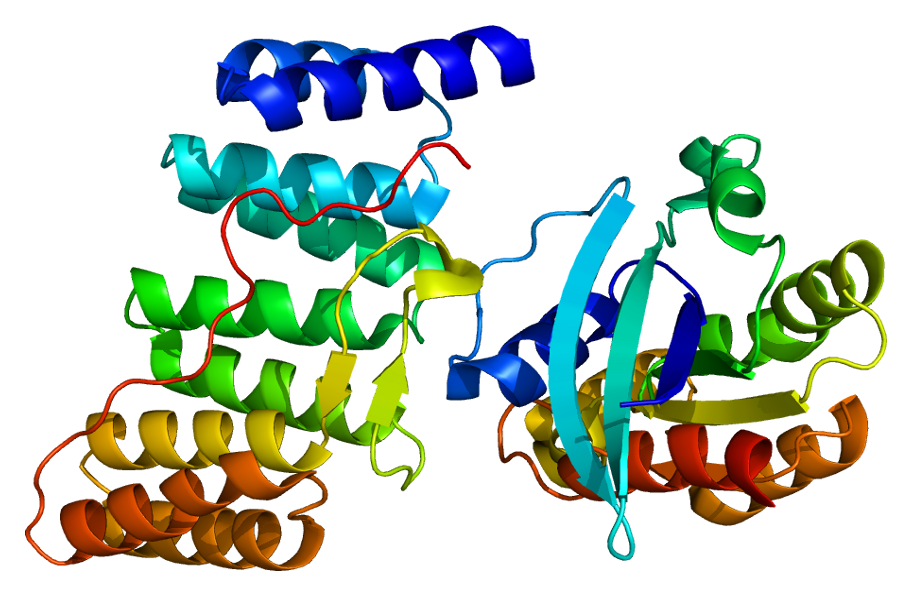

Identifiers
- Aliases: NCF2, NCF-2, NOXA2, P67-PHOX, P67PHOX, Neutrophil cytosolic factor 2
- External IDs: OMIM: 608515; MGI: 97284; GeneCards: NCF2
Available structures
PDB	Ortholog search: PDBe RCSB
PDB	List of PDB id codes 1E96, 1HH8, 1K4U, 1OEY, 1WM5, 2DMO

Gene location (Human)
Chr.	Chromosome 1 (human)
Band	1q25.3	Start	183,555,562 bp
Band	1q25.3	End	183,590,876 bp

Gene location (Mouse)
Chr.	Chromosome 1 (mouse)
Band	1 G3|1 65.05 cM	Start	152,675,945 bp
Band	1 G3|1 65.05 cM	End	152,712,742 bp
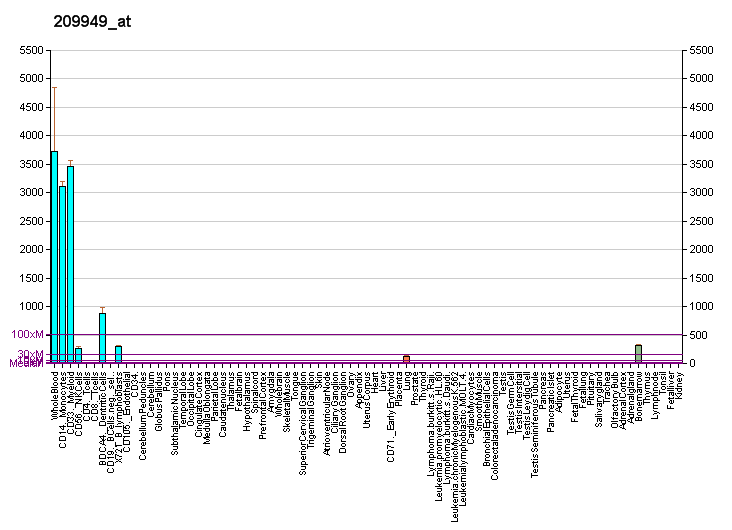
RNA expression pattern
Bgee	Human / Mouse (ortholog); Top expressed in: monocyte; blood; granulocyte; bone marrow; bone marrow cell; right lung; spleen; trabecular bone; upper lobe of left lung; periodontal fiber / Top expressed in: granulocyte; spleen; bone marrow; ileum; jejunum; colon; lung; ovary; uterus; thymus; More reference expression data
BioGPS	More reference expression data
Gene ontology
Molecular function	superoxide-generating NAD(P)H oxidase activity; protein C-terminus binding; protein binding; electron transfer activity; superoxide-generating NADPH oxidase activator activity
Cellular component	acrosomal vesicle; nucleolus; phagolysosome; cytoplasm; cytosol; NADPH oxidase complex
Biological process	superoxide anion generation; cellular defense response; vascular endothelial growth factor receptor signaling pathway; innate immune response; superoxide metabolic process; phagocytosis; positive regulation of catalytic activity; respiratory burst; electron transport chain; antigen processing and presentation of exogenous peptide antigen via MHC class I, TAP-dependent; cellular response to oxidative stress; cell redox homeostasis
Sources:Amigo / QuickGO
Orthologs
Databases	NCBI: entry; OMA: entry
Species	Human	Mouse
Entrez	4688	17970
Ensembl	ENSG00000116701	ENSMUSG00000026480
UniProt	P19878	O70145
RefSeq (mRNA)	NM_000433; NM_001127651; NM_001190789; NM_001190794	NM_010877
RefSeq (protein)	NP_000424; NP_001121123; NP_001177718; NP_001177723	NP_035007
Location (UCSC)	Chr 1: 183.56 – 183.59 Mb	Chr 1: 152.68 – 152.71 Mb
PubMed search
- Wikidata
View/Edit Human	View/Edit Mouse

Neutrophil cytosol factor 2 is a protein that in humans is encoded by the NCF2 gene.

== Function ==
This gene encodes neutrophil cytosolic factor 2, the 67-kilodalton cytosolic subunit of the multi-protein complex known as NADPH oxidase found in neutrophils. This oxidase produces a burst of superoxide which is delivered to the lumen of the neutrophil phagosome. Mutations in this gene, as well as in other NADPH oxidase subunits, can result in chronic granulomatous disease.
