= CDC23 =

Protein-coding gene in humans

Identifiers
- Aliases: CDC23, ANAPC8, APC8, CUT23, cell division cycle 23
- External IDs: OMIM: 603462; MGI: 1098815; GeneCards: CDC23
Available structures
PDB	Ortholog search: PDBe RCSB
PDB	List of PDB id codes 4UI9, 5A31, 5G05, 5G04

Gene location (Human)
Chr.	Chromosome 5 (human)
Band	5q31.2	Start	138,187,650 bp
Band	5q31.2	End	138,213,343 bp

Gene location (Mouse)
Chr.	Chromosome 18 (mouse)
Band	18 B1|18 18.69 cM	Start	34,764,004 bp
Band	18 B1|18 18.69 cM	End	34,784,788 bp
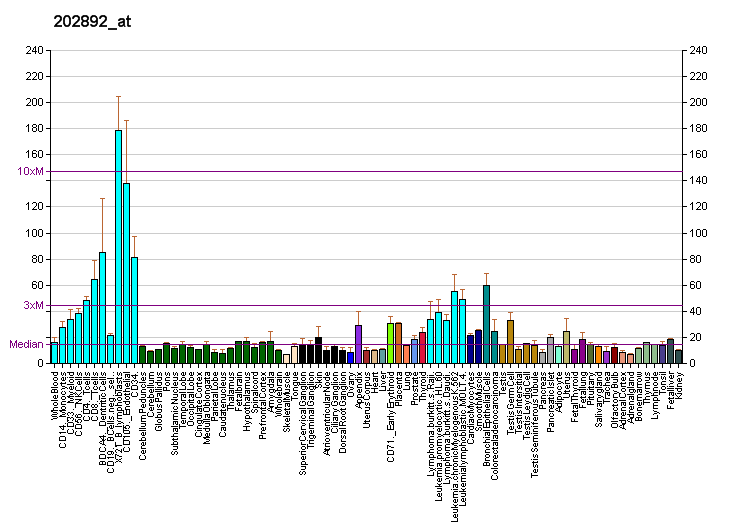
RNA expression pattern
Bgee	Human / Mouse (ortholog); Top expressed in: gonad; ventricular zone; tibia; endothelial cell; rectum; cerebellar hemisphere; right hemisphere of cerebellum; ovary; islet of Langerhans; left ovary / Top expressed in: genital tubercle; tail of embryo; ventricular zone; mandibular prominence; medullary collecting duct; superior cervical ganglion; maxillary prominence; abdominal wall; ganglionic eminence; renal corpuscle; More reference expression data
BioGPS	More reference expression data
Gene ontology
Molecular function	ubiquitin-protein transferase activity; protein binding
Cellular component	nucleoplasm; cytosol; intracellular anatomical structure; anaphase-promoting complex
Biological process	ubiquitin-dependent protein catabolic process; regulation of exit from mitosis; regulation of mitotic metaphase/anaphase transition; cell cycle; cell division; protein K11-linked ubiquitination; metaphase; anaphase-promoting complex-dependent catabolic process; protein ubiquitination; mitotic metaphase plate congression; mitotic cell cycle; regulation of mitotic cell cycle phase transition
Sources:Amigo / QuickGO
Orthologs
Databases	NCBI: entry; OMA: entry
Species	Human	Mouse
Entrez	8697	52563
Ensembl	ENSG00000094880	ENSMUSG00000024370
UniProt	Q9UJX2	Q8BGZ4
RefSeq (mRNA)	NM_004661	NM_178347
RefSeq (protein)	NP_004652	NP_848124
Location (UCSC)	Chr 5: 138.19 – 138.21 Mb	Chr 18: 34.76 – 34.78 Mb
PubMed search
- Wikidata
View/Edit Human	View/Edit Mouse

Cell division cycle 23 homolog (S. cerevisiae), also known as CDC23, is a protein that is encoded by the CDC23 gene in humans.

== Function ==
The CDC23 protein shares strong similarity with Saccharomyces cerevisiae Cdc23, a protein essential for cell cycle progression through the G2/M transition. This protein is a component of anaphase-promoting complex (APC), which is composed of eight protein subunits and highly conserved in eukaryotic cells. APC catalyzes the formation of cyclin B-ubiquitin conjugate that is responsible for the ubiquitin-mediated proteolysis of B-type cyclins. This protein and 3 other members of the APC complex contain the TPR (tetratricopeptide repeat), a protein domain important for protein-protein interaction.

== Interactions ==
CDC23 has been shown to interact with CDC27.
