= IFIT3 =

Protein-coding gene in the species Homo sapiens

Identifiers
- Aliases: IFIT3, CIG-49, GARG-49, IFI60, IFIT4, IRG2, ISG60, P60, RIG-G, cig41, interferon induced protein with tetratricopeptide repeats 3
- External IDs: OMIM: 604650; MGI: 1101055; GeneCards: IFIT3

Gene location (Human)
Chr.	Chromosome 10 (human)
Band	10q23.31	Start	89,327,307 bp
Band	10q23.31	End	89,377,473 bp

Gene location (Mouse)
Chr.	Chromosome 19 (mouse)
Band	19|19 C1	Start	34,560,931 bp
Band	19|19 C1	End	34,566,131 bp
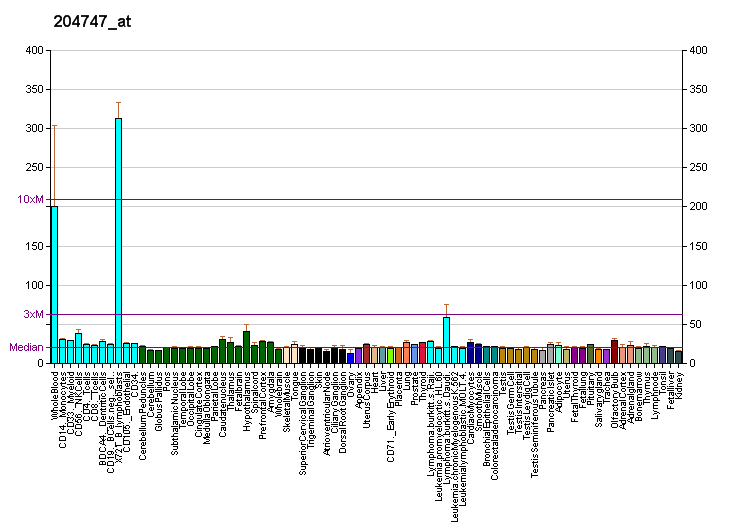
RNA expression pattern
Bgee	Human / Mouse (ortholog); Top expressed in: trigeminal ganglion; jejunal mucosa; pericardium; lower lobe of lung; spinal ganglia; human penis; palpebral conjunctiva; monocyte; endothelial cell; synovial joint / Top expressed in: right kidney; granulocyte; human kidney; thymus; jejunum; lung; colon; adrenal gland; spleen; embryo; More reference expression data
BioGPS	More reference expression data
Gene ontology
Molecular function	identical protein binding; protein binding; molecular function; RNA binding
Cellular component	cytoplasm; mitochondrion; cytosol
Biological process	immune system process; response to virus; innate immune response; negative regulation of apoptotic process; defense response to virus; type I interferon signaling pathway; negative regulation of cell population proliferation; cellular response to interferon-alpha; response to bacterium; cellular response to interferon-beta
Sources:Amigo / QuickGO
Orthologs
Databases	NCBI: entry; OMA: entry
Species	Human	Mouse
Entrez	3437	15959
Ensembl	ENSG00000119917	ENSMUSG00000074896
UniProt	O14879	Q64345
RefSeq (mRNA)	NM_001549; NM_001031683; NM_001289758; NM_001289759	NM_010501
RefSeq (protein)	NP_001026853; NP_001276687; NP_001276688; NP_001540	NP_034631
Location (UCSC)	Chr 10: 89.33 – 89.38 Mb	Chr 19: 34.56 – 34.57 Mb
PubMed search
- Wikidata
View/Edit Human	View/Edit Mouse

Interferon-induced protein with tetratricopeptide repeats 3, also known as interferon-stimulated gene 49 (ISG49), is a protein that in humans is encoded by the IFIT3 gene. It plays a part in the innate immune response to viruses in response to type I interferon signaling.
