= IFIT2 =

Protein-coding gene in the species Homo sapiens

Identifiers
- Aliases: IFIT2, G10P2, GARG-39, IFI-54, IFI-54K, IFI54, IFIT-2, ISG-54 K, ISG-54K, ISG54, P54, cig42, interferon induced protein with tetratricopeptide repeats 2, ISG-54
- External IDs: OMIM: 147040; MGI: 99449; GeneCards: IFIT2
Available structures
PDB	Ortholog search: PDBe RCSB
PDB	List of PDB id codes 4G1T

Gene location (Human)
Chr.	Chromosome 10 (human)
Band	10q23.31	Start	89,283,694 bp
Band	10q23.31	End	89,309,271 bp

Gene location (Mouse)
Chr.	Chromosome 19 (mouse)
Band	19|19 C1	Start	34,528,094 bp
Band	19|19 C1	End	34,553,819 bp
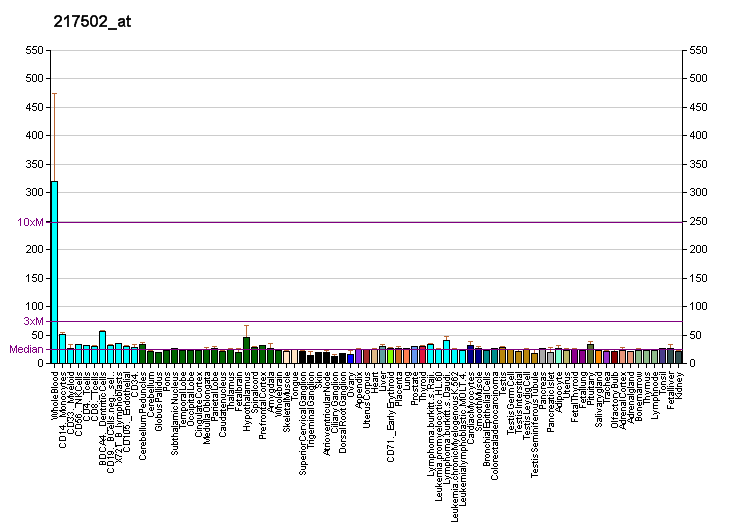
RNA expression pattern
Bgee	Human / Mouse (ortholog); Top expressed in: palpebral conjunctiva; inferior ganglion of vagus nerve; trigeminal ganglion; subthalamic nucleus; visceral pleura; white blood cell; monocyte; external globus pallidus; parietal pleura; spinal ganglia / Top expressed in: iris; mammillary body; lumbar spinal ganglion; decidua; endothelial cell of lymphatic vessel; blood; ciliary body; sciatic nerve; medial geniculate nucleus; medial dorsal nucleus; More reference expression data
BioGPS	More reference expression data
Gene ontology
Molecular function	protein binding; RNA binding
Cellular component	cytoplasm; cytosol; endoplasmic reticulum
Biological process	apoptotic process; positive regulation of apoptotic process; response to virus; innate immune response; defense response to virus; negative regulation of protein binding; apoptotic mitochondrial changes; type I interferon signaling pathway; cellular response to interferon-alpha; immune system process
Sources:Amigo / QuickGO
Orthologs
Databases	NCBI: entry; OMA: entry
Species	Human	Mouse
Entrez	3433	15958
Ensembl	ENSG00000119922	ENSMUSG00000045932
UniProt	P09913	Q64112
RefSeq (mRNA)	NM_001547	NM_008332; NM_001355262
RefSeq (protein)	NP_001538	NP_032358; NP_001342191
Location (UCSC)	Chr 10: 89.28 – 89.31 Mb	Chr 19: 34.53 – 34.55 Mb
PubMed search
- Wikidata
View/Edit Human	View/Edit Mouse

Interferon-induced protein with tetratricopeptide repeats 2 (commonly termed IFIT2) is a protein that in humans is directed to be produced by the IFIT2 gene. Previously, this gene was termed the G10P2, GARG-39, IFI-54, IFI-54K, IFI54, IFIT-2, ISG-54 K, ISG-54K, ISG54, or P54 gene and the protein that it directs to be produced was termed the G10P2, GARG-39, IFI-54, IFI-54K, IFI54, IFIT-2, ISG-54 K, ISG-54K, ISG54, or P54 protein. The IFIT2 gene is one of the many genes that are stimulated by type 1 interferons to form their messenger RNAs and thereby their product proteins. Consequently, the IFIT2 gene is classified as one of the many type 1 interferon-stimulated genes.

== Clinical significance ==
IFIT2 may play a role in preventing tumor progression. Indeed, IFIT2 gene has been detected progressively downregulated in Human papillomavirus-positive neoplastic keratinocytes derived from uterine cervical preneoplastic lesions at different levels of malignancy. For this reason, this gene is likely to be associated with tumorigenesis and may be a potential prognostic marker for uterine cervical preneoplastic lesions progression.
