= CDC16 =

Protein-coding gene in humans

Identifiers
- Aliases: CDC16, ANAPC6, APC6, CUT9, CDC16Hs, cell division cycle 16
- External IDs: OMIM: 603461; MGI: 1917207; GeneCards: CDC16
Available structures
PDB	Ortholog search: PDBe RCSB
PDB	List of PDB id codes 3HYM, 4UI9, 5A31, 5G04, 5G05

Gene location (Human)
Chr.	Chromosome 13 (human)
Band	13q34	Start	114,234,887 bp
Band	13q34	End	114,272,723 bp

Gene location (Mouse)
Chr.	Chromosome 8 (mouse)
Band	8|8 A1.1	Start	13,757,676 bp
Band	8|8 A1.1	End	13,781,938 bp
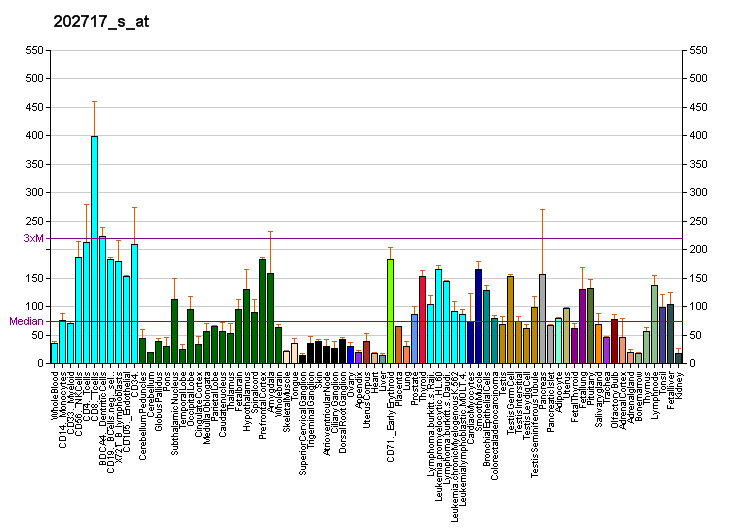

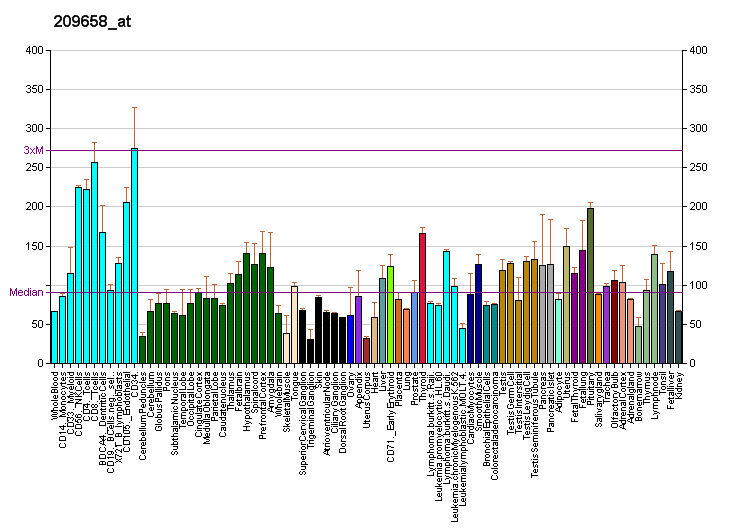

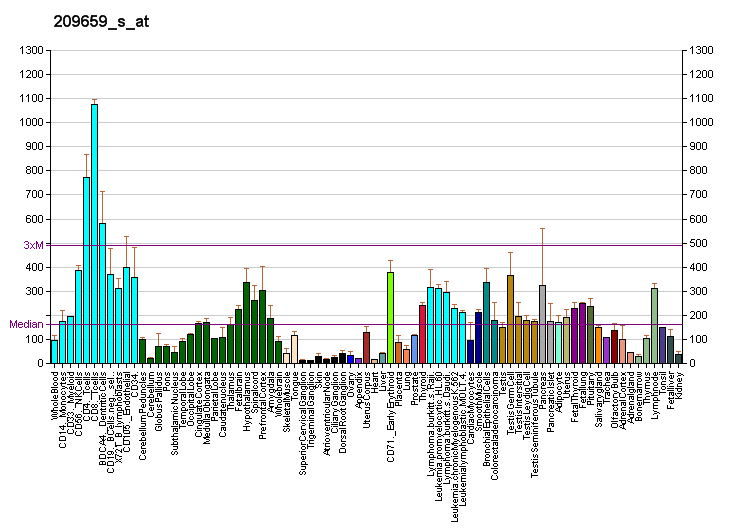
RNA expression pattern
Bgee	Human / Mouse (ortholog); Top expressed in: right uterine tube; bronchial epithelial cell; body of pancreas; left ovary; body of uterus; canal of the cervix; tibial nerve; pars reticulata; right ovary; skin of abdomen / Top expressed in: calvaria; vas deferens; fossa; efferent ductule; dermis; condyle; primitive streak; abdominal wall; ureter; mandibular prominence; More reference expression data
BioGPS	More reference expression data
Gene ontology
Molecular function	protein binding
Cellular component	microtubule organizing center; nucleus; spindle microtubule; anaphase-promoting complex; cytoskeleton; nucleoplasm; cytosol; cytoplasm; centrosome; spindle
Biological process	protein K11-linked ubiquitination; regulation of mitotic nuclear division; anaphase-promoting complex-dependent catabolic process; cell population proliferation; protein ubiquitination; cell division; cell cycle; mitotic cell cycle; regulation of mitotic cell cycle phase transition; ubiquitin-dependent protein catabolic process
Sources:Amigo / QuickGO
Orthologs
Databases	NCBI: entry; OMA: entry
Species	Human	Mouse
Entrez	8881	69957
Ensembl	ENSG00000130177	ENSMUSG00000038416
UniProt	Q13042	Q8R349
RefSeq (mRNA)	NM_001078645; NM_003903; NM_001318517; NM_001318518; NM_001330101 NM_001330104; NM_001330105	NM_027276; NM_001357247
RefSeq (protein)	NP_001072113; NP_001305446; NP_001305447; NP_001317030; NP_001317033 NP_001317034; NP_003894	NP_081552; NP_001344176
Location (UCSC)	Chr 13: 114.23 – 114.27 Mb	Chr 8: 13.76 – 13.78 Mb
PubMed search
- Wikidata
View/Edit Human	View/Edit Mouse

Cell division cycle protein 16 homolog is a protein that in humans is encoded by the CDC16 gene.

== Function ==
This gene encodes a component protein of the APC complex, which is composed of eight proteins and functions as a protein ubiquitin ligase. The APC complex is a cyclin degradation system that governs exit from mitosis. Each component protein of the APC complex is highly conserved among eukaryotic organisms. This protein and two other APC complex proteins, CDC23 and CDC27, contain a tetratricopeptide repeat (TPR), a protein domain that may be involved in protein-protein interaction. Multiple alternatively spliced variants, encoding the same protein, have been identified.

== Interactions ==
CDC16 has been shown to interact with CDC27 and CDC20.
