= IFIT1 =

Protein-coding gene in the species Homo sapiens

Identifiers
- Aliases: IFIT1, C56, G10P1, IFI-56, IFI-56K, IFI56, IFIT-1, IFNAI1, ISG56, P56, RNM561, interferon induced protein with tetratricopeptide repeats 1
- External IDs: OMIM: 147690; MGI: 2148249; GeneCards: IFIT1
Available structures
PDB	Ortholog search: PDBe RCSB
PDB	List of PDB id codes 4HOU

Gene location (Mouse)
Chr.	Chromosome 19 (mouse)
Band	19|19 C1	Start	34,594,449 bp
Band	19|19 C1	End	34,618,143 bp
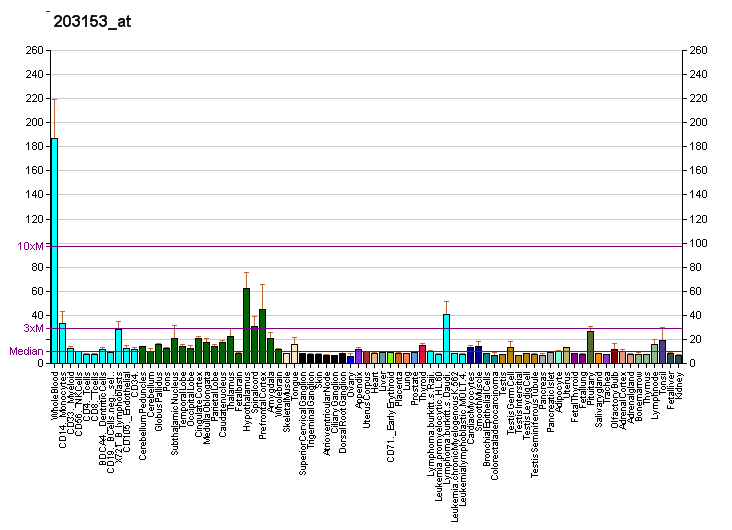
RNA expression pattern
Bgee	Human / Mouse (ortholog); Top expressed in: pons; trigeminal ganglion; biceps brachii; glomerulus; metanephric glomerulus; palpebral conjunctiva; subthalamic nucleus; germinal epithelium; amniotic fluid; parietal pleura / Top expressed in: epithelium of small intestine; zygote; jejunum; secondary oocyte; ileum; interventricular septum; granulocyte; primary oocyte; duodenum; migratory enteric neural crest cell; More reference expression data
BioGPS	More reference expression data
Gene ontology
Molecular function	protein binding; RNA binding
Cellular component	cytoplasm; host cell; cytosol
Biological process	negative regulation of helicase activity; response to virus; positive regulation of viral genome replication; negative regulation of viral genome replication; negative regulation of defense response to virus by host; cellular response to type I interferon; viral process; intracellular transport of viral protein in host cell; negative regulation of protein binding; type I interferon signaling pathway; innate immune response; regulation of defense response to virus; cellular response to exogenous dsRNA; immune system process; defense response to virus; response to bacterium; cellular response to interferon-beta
Sources:Amigo / QuickGO
Orthologs
Databases	NCBI: entry
Species	Human	Mouse
Entrez	3434	112419
Ensembl	n/a	ENSMUSG00000067297
UniProt	P09914	Q3U687
RefSeq (mRNA)	NM_001548; NM_001270927; NM_001270928; NM_001270929; NM_001270930	NM_053217; NM_001362130
RefSeq (protein)	NP_001257856; NP_001257857; NP_001257858; NP_001257859; NP_001539	NP_444447; NP_001349059
Location (UCSC)	n/a	Chr 19: 34.59 – 34.62 Mb
PubMed search
- Wikidata
View/Edit Human	View/Edit Mouse

Interferon-induced protein with tetratricopeptide repeats 1 is a protein that in humans is encoded by the IFIT1 gene.
