= TMTC2 =

Protein-coding gene in the species Homo sapiens

Identifiers
- Aliases: TMTC2, IBDBP1, transmembrane and tetratricopeptide repeat containing 2, transmembrane O-mannosyltransferase targeting cadherins 2
- External IDs: OMIM: 615856; MGI: 1914057; GeneCards: TMTC2
Enzyme activity
EC #	BRENDA	ExPASy	KEGG	MetaCyc
2.4.1.109	↗	↗	↗	↗

Gene location (Human)
Chr.	Chromosome 12 (human)
Band	12q21.31	Start	82,686,880 bp
Band	12q21.31	End	83,134,870 bp

Gene location (Mouse)
Chr.	Chromosome 10 (mouse)
Band	10|10 D1	Start	105,023,524 bp
Band	10|10 D1	End	105,410,312 bp
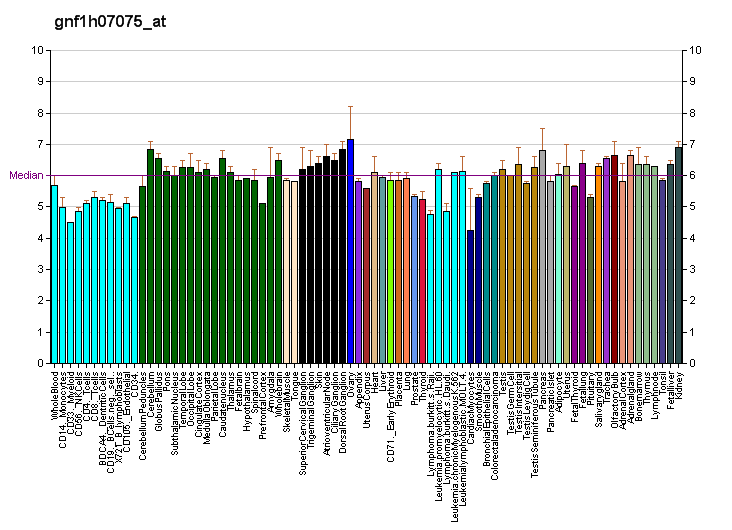
RNA expression pattern
Bgee	Human / Mouse (ortholog); Top expressed in: ventricular zone; corpus callosum; mucosa of paranasal sinus; ganglionic eminence; caput epididymis; C1 segment; corpus epididymis; right uterine tube; inferior ganglion of vagus nerve; tail of epididymis / Top expressed in: hand; cumulus cell; renal capsule; body of femur; clavicle; vas deferens; molar; left lung lobe; olfactory epithelium; membranous bone; More reference expression data
BioGPS	More reference expression data
Gene ontology
Molecular function	protein binding; mannosyltransferase activity; dolichyl-phosphate-mannose-protein mannosyltransferase activity; transferase activity
Cellular component	integral component of membrane; endoplasmic reticulum membrane; endoplasmic reticulum; membrane
Biological process	calcium ion homeostasis; protein O-linked mannosylation; protein glycosylation
Sources:Amigo / QuickGO
Orthologs
Databases	NCBI: entry; OMA: entry
Species	Human	Mouse
Entrez	160335	278279
Ensembl	ENSG00000179104	ENSMUSG00000036019
UniProt	Q8N394	Q56A06
RefSeq (mRNA)	NM_152588; NM_001320321; NM_001320322	NM_177368
RefSeq (protein)	NP_001307250; NP_001307251; NP_689801	NP_796342
Location (UCSC)	Chr 12: 82.69 – 83.13 Mb	Chr 10: 105.02 – 105.41 Mb
PubMed search
- Wikidata
View/Edit Human	View/Edit Mouse

Transmembrane and TPR repeat-containing protein 2 is a protein that in humans is encoded by the TMTC2 gene.
