= Aurora kinase C =

Protein-coding gene in the species Homo sapiens

AURKC

Identifiers
- Aliases: AURKC, AIE2, AIK3, ARK3, AurC, SPGF5, STK13, aurora-C, HEL-S-90, aurora kinase C
- External IDs: OMIM: 603495; MGI: 1321119; GeneCards: AURKC
Enzyme activity
EC #	BRENDA	ExPASy	KEGG	MetaCyc
2.7.11.1	↗	↗	↗	↗

Gene location (Human)
Chr.	Chromosome 19 (human)
Band	19q13.43	Start	57,231,009 bp
Band	19q13.43	End	57,235,548 bp

Gene location (Mouse)
Chr.	Chromosome 7 (mouse)
Band	7 A1|7 4.06 cM	Start	6,998,299 bp
Band	7 A1|7 4.06 cM	End	7,006,090 bp
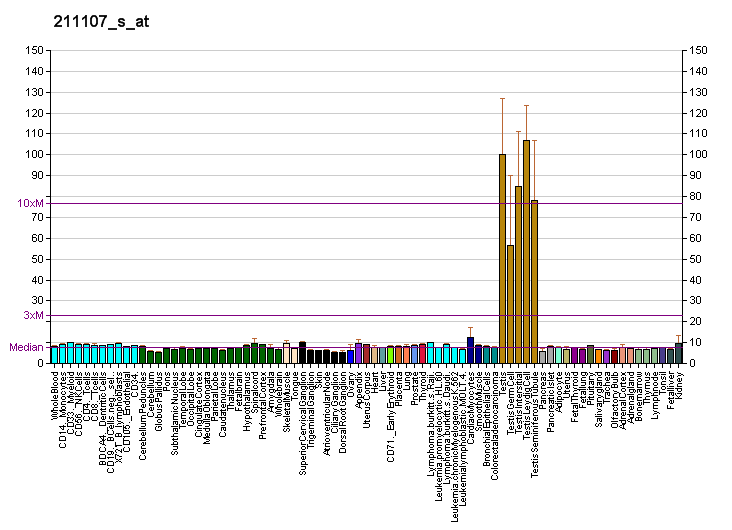
RNA expression pattern
Bgee	Human / Mouse (ortholog); Top expressed in: oocyte; secondary oocyte; left testis; right testis; gonad; testicle; sperm; stromal cell of endometrium; spleen; apex of heart / Top expressed in: secondary oocyte; zygote; primary oocyte; morula; blastocyst; male human body; male reproductive system; testicle; embryo; spermatocyte; More reference expression data
BioGPS	More reference expression data
Gene ontology
Molecular function	transferase activity; protein kinase activity; nucleotide binding; histone serine kinase activity; kinase activity; protein serine/threonine kinase activity; protein serine/threonine/tyrosine kinase activity; ATP binding; protein binding
Cellular component	cytoplasm; spindle; spindle pole centrosome; chromosome; chromosome passenger complex; midbody; spindle microtubule; spindle midzone; chromosome, centromeric region; cytoskeleton; condensed chromosome; nucleus
Biological process	phosphorylation; mitotic spindle midzone assembly; histone modification; oocyte development; positive regulation of cytokinesis; cell division; protein phosphorylation; meiosis; spindle midzone assembly; spermatogenesis; cell cycle; attachment of spindle microtubules to kinetochore; cytokinesis; mitotic spindle organization; regulation of cytokinesis
Sources:Amigo / QuickGO
Orthologs
Databases	NCBI: entry; OMA: entry
Species	Human	Mouse
Entrez	6795	20871
Ensembl	ENSG00000105146	ENSMUSG00000070837
UniProt	Q9UQB9	O88445
RefSeq (mRNA)	NM_001015878; NM_001015879; NM_003160	NM_001080965; NM_001080966; NM_020572
RefSeq (protein)	NP_001015878; NP_001015879; NP_003151	NP_001074434; NP_001074435; NP_065597
Location (UCSC)	Chr 19: 57.23 – 57.24 Mb	Chr 7: 7 – 7.01 Mb
PubMed search
- Wikidata
View/Edit Human	View/Edit Mouse

Aurora kinase C, also Serine/threonine-protein kinase 13 is an enzyme that in humans is encoded by the AURKC gene.

== Function ==
This gene encodes a member of the highly conserved Aurora subfamily of serine/threonine protein kinases with two other members, Aurora A and Aurora B. The encoded protein is a chromosomal passenger protein that forms complexes with Aurora-B and inner centromere proteins and may play a role in organizing microtubules in relation to centrosome/spindle function during mitosis. This gene is overexpressed in several cancer cell lines, suggesting an involvement in oncogenic signal transduction. Alternative splicing results in multiple transcript variants.

== Function ==
Temporal expression patterns and subcellular localization of Aurora kinases in mitotic cells from G2 to cytokinesis indicate association with mitotic and meiotic structure. Although yeast contain only one Aurora kinase and C. elegans and Drosophila contain only two, mammals have three Aurora kinases with 67-76% homology that are structurally similar and localize similarly.

Aurora C localizes to the centrosome and then to the midzone of mitotic cells from anaphase to cytokinesis. It is expressed about an order of magnitude less than Aurora B in diploid human fibroblasts, with mRNA and protein concentrations peaking during the G2/M phase. Aurora C levels, however, peak after those of Aurora B later in the M phase. While Aurora A and B are expressed in mitotic somatic cells, Aurora C is more often expressed during meiosis (spermatogenesis and oogenesis).

Aurora B kinase regulates kinetochore maturation, destabilization of improper kinetochore-microtubule attachments, and spindle assembly checkpoint (SAC), central spindle organization, and cytokinesis. Aneuploidy results from independent and simultaneous inhibition of Aurora B and Aurora C. Slattery et al. found that they have overlapping functions and that Aurora C was able to rescue Aurora B-deficient mitotic cells from aneuploidy.

== Clinical significance ==
Expression is typically limited to meiotic cells, but overexpression occurs in some cancer cell lines. PLZF, a transcription repressor, and its CpG island methylation are the most studied modes of regulating AURKC regulation. Although all of the Aurora kinases are overexpressed in many cancer cell lines, only Aurora A and C possess oncogenic activity, producing multinucleated cells and tumors in vivo when overexpressed. When cells overexpressing Aurora C were treated with nocodazole to turn on the SAC, Aurora B protein stability and activity decreased. This then prevented activation of SAC protein BubR1 and phosphorylation of histone H3 and MCAK.

Inactivating mutations of Aurora C have been shown to cause infertility in men characterized by macrocephalic and multiflagellular spermatozoa. Homozygous and heterozygous c.144delC mutation in the AURKC gene was found with an allelic frequency of 2.14% in Moroccan men with unexplained spermatogenic failure. The heterozygous state had a frequency of 1% in normospermic fertile men. Although c.144delC represents 85.5% of mutant alleles, the nonsense mutation p.Y248* (13% of all mutant alleles) is present in both European and African men and can lead to infertility. Klinefelter syndrome and Y chromosome microdeletion analyses are the most common genetic tests offered to infertile men, but AURKC and DPY19L2 defects are the leading cause of infertility in North African men.

== Interactions ==
Both Aurora B and C interact with the inner centromere protein (INCENP) from the C-terminal to the conserved IN box domain, but Aurora B preferentially binds INCENP. The chromosomal passenger complex (CPC), essential for chromosome segregation, contains the four subunits: the Aurora kinase, INCENP, survivin, and borealin (also known as dasra). Co-expression of Aurora B and C in vivo interferes with INCENP binding, localization, and stability.
