= Bill Earnshaw =

Professor of Chromosome Dynamics at the University of Edinburgh

Bill Earnshaw FRS FRSE FMedSci
- Born: William Charles Earnshaw
- Education: Lenox School for Boys; Colby College (BS); Massachusetts Institute of Technology (PhD)
- Awards: EMBO Member (1999)
- Scientific career
- Workplaces: University of Edinburgh; Johns Hopkins University; University of Geneva; University of Cambridge
- Thesis: The Structure of Bacteriophage p22 and its Assembly Intermediates (1977)
- Website: www.wcb.ed.ac.uk/research/earnshaw; earnshaw.bio.ed.ac.uk/prof-bill-earnshaw-frse

William Charles Earnshaw is an American biologist who is Professor of Chromosome Dynamics at the University of Edinburgh, where he has been a Wellcome Trust Principal Research Fellow since 1996.

== Education ==
Earnshaw was educated at Lenox School for Boys, Colby College and Massachusetts Institute of Technology (MIT) where he was awarded a PhD in 1977 for research on Enterobacteria phage P22 supervised by Jonathan King.

== Career and research ==
Earnshaw completed postdoctoral research at the University of Cambridge with Aaron Klug and Ron Laskey and at the University of Geneva with Ulrich Laemmli. Following this, he moved to the Johns Hopkins School of Medicine, working in Tom Pollard's department of cell biology for 13 years. His former doctoral students include Jan Bergmann, Anca Petruti-Mot, Susana Ribeiro, Laura Wood, Zhenjie Xu, and Nikolaj Zuleger.

=== Awards and honours ===
Earnshaw was elected a Fellow of the Royal Society (FRS) in 2013. His certificate of election reads:

Bill Earnshaw is distinguished for studies of mitotic chromosome structure and segregation. His pioneering use of scleroderma patient sera identified the first centromeric proteins and recent studies employing human synthetic artificial chromosomes are mapping the epigenetic landscape required for kinetochore assembly. He discovered the "chromosomal passenger complex" of INCENP, Aurora B kinase, Survivin and Borealin – a major regulator of mitosis and cytokinesis. His proteomic analysis of mitotic chromosomes continues to provide new insights into kinetochore composition and function. Earnshaw also developed the first system reproducing apoptotic execution in vitro, and used it to identify the first apoptotic caspase substrate.

Earnshaw is also an elected Fellow of the Royal Society of Edinburgh (FRSE), the Academy of Medical Sciences (FMedSci) and a member of the European Molecular Biology Organization (EMBO).
