= Chromosomal passenger complex =

The chromosomal passenger complex (CPC) is a protein complex composed of Aurora B kinase, Survivin, Borealin and inner centromere protein.

The CPC is mainly located at the inner centromere during mitotic cell divisions, through interactions with nucleosomes. It plays multiple regulatory roles during cell division including sister chromatid cohesion, mediating attachments between kinetochores and microtubules, and the spindle assembly checkpoint.
