= RCC2 =

Protein-coding gene in humans

Identifiers
- Aliases: RCC2, TD-60, regulator of chromosome condensation 2
- External IDs: OMIM: 609587; MGI: 1919784; GeneCards: RCC2

Gene location (Human)
Chr.	Chromosome 1 (human)
Band	1p36.13	Start	17,406,760 bp
Band	1p36.13	End	17,439,677 bp

Gene location (Mouse)
Chr.	Chromosome 4 (mouse)
Band	4|4 D3	Start	140,427,852 bp
Band	4|4 D3	End	140,450,531 bp
RNA expression pattern
Bgee	Human / Mouse (ortholog); Top expressed in: ganglionic eminence; lymph node; monocyte; skin of abdomen; stromal cell of endometrium; ventricular zone; skin of leg; appendix; granulocyte; gonad / Top expressed in: ventricular zone; primitive streak; somite; epiblast; thymus; abdominal wall; fetal liver hematopoietic progenitor cell; ganglionic eminence; medial ganglionic eminence; lip; More reference expression data
BioGPS	n/a
Gene ontology
Molecular function	protein domain specific binding; microtubule binding; small GTPase binding; protein binding; protein kinase binding; RNA binding; guanyl-nucleotide exchange factor activity
Cellular component	cytoplasm; cytosol; early endosome membrane; membrane; plasma membrane; spindle; chromosome, centromeric core domain; chromosome; mitotic spindle midzone; midbody; nucleolus; microtubule; chromosome, centromeric region; cytoskeleton; nucleus
Biological process	regulation of cell migration; activation of GTPase activity; establishment of protein localization; cell division; chromosome passenger complex localization to kinetochore; positive regulation of attachment of spindle microtubules to kinetochore; focal adhesion assembly; negative regulation of GTPase activity; regulation of ruffle assembly; integrin-mediated signaling pathway; positive regulation of G2/M transition of mitotic cell cycle; cell cycle; negative regulation of substrate adhesion-dependent cell spreading; regulation of fibroblast migration; negative regulation of focal adhesion assembly; sister chromatid cohesion
Sources:Amigo / QuickGO
Orthologs
Databases	NCBI: entry; OMA: entry
Species	Human	Mouse
Entrez	55920	108911
Ensembl	ENSG00000281540; ENSG00000179051	ENSMUSG00000040945
UniProt	Q9P258	Q8BK67
RefSeq (mRNA)	NM_018715; NM_001136204	NM_173867
RefSeq (protein)	NP_001129676; NP_061185; NP_001129676.1; NP_061185.1	NP_776292
Location (UCSC)	Chr 1: 17.41 – 17.44 Mb	Chr 4: 140.43 – 140.45 Mb
PubMed search
- Wikidata
View/Edit Human	View/Edit Mouse

Protein RCC2 also known as telophase disk protein of 60 kDa (TD-60) or RCC1-like protein TD-60 is a protein that in humans is encoded by the RCC2 gene.

== Function ==
RCC2 has structural similarity to RCC1, and has been shown to have weak guanine nucleotide exchange factor (GEF) activity on the small GTPase Rac. TD-60 has also been shown to interact with the Chromosomal Passenger Complex (CPC), and to activate the catalytic component of the CPC, Aurora B, in the presence of microtubules.
