= DPY =

DPY or dpy can refer to:

- dpy, a gene class that contains the DPY19L2 gene
- Oreoicidae, a family of songbirds from New Guinea and Australia, by Catalogue of Life identifier
- Departure Yard Railway Station, a train station in Karachi, Pakistan

== See also ==
- DPYS, a gene that codes for the metabolic enzyme dihydropyrimidase
