= Tinengotinib =

Chemical compound

Clinical data
- Other names: TT-00420

Identifiers
- IUPAC name: 4-[9-(2-chlorophenyl)-6-methyl-2,4,5,8,12-pentazatricyclo[8.4.0.0^{3,7}]tetradeca-1(14),3,6,8,10,12-hexaen-13-yl]morpholine
- CAS Number: 2230490-29-4
- PubChem CID: 137279257
- DrugBank: DB17384
- ChemSpider: 115008005
- UNII: WZ9TJ0L9Y8
- KEGG: D12545
- ChEMBL: ChEMBL5314430

Chemical and physical data
- Formula: C_{20}H_{19}ClN_{6}O
- Molar mass: 394.86 g·mol^{−1}
- 3D model (JSmol): Interactive image
- SMILES: CC1=C2C(=NN1)NC3=CC(=NC=C3C(=N2)C4=CC=CC=C4Cl)N5CCOCC5
- InChI: InChI=InChI=1S/C20H19ClN6O/c1-12-18-20(26-25-12)23-16-10-17(27-6-8-28-9-7-27)22-11-14(16)19(24-18)13-4-2-3-5-15(13)21/h2-5,10-11H,6-9H2,1H3,(H2,23,25,26); Key:DQFCVOOFMXEPOC-UHFFFAOYSA-N

Tinengotinib is an investigational new drug that is being evaluated for the treatment of cancer.

It is an multi-kinase inhibitor designed to target a range of kinases involved in cancer cell proliferation, angiogenesis, and immune response modulation. Specifically, it inhibits fibroblast growth factor receptors (FGFRs) 1–3, janus kinase (JAK) 1/2, vascular endothelial growth factor receptors (VEGFRs), and aurora kinases A/B.
