= EPR1 =

Withdrawn database record

Effector cell peptidase receptor 1, also known as EPR1, is a withdrawn database record.

This locus represents an antisense transcript of the survivin locus. This record was withdrawn in collaboration with HGNC. It was defined by L26245.1, which appears to be a cloning artifact (Zaman GJ, Conway EM (July 2000). "The elusive factor Xa receptor: failure to detect transcripts that correspond to the published sequence of EPR-1". Blood. 96 (1): 145–8. doi:10.1182/blood.v96.1.145. PMID 10891443.).(This information come from https://www.ncbi.nlm.nih.gov/gene?term=L26245.1)
