= William Earnshaw =

William Earnshaw may refer to:

- William Earnshaw (politician), New Zealand member of parliament
- William Earnshaw (minister), American minister
- William C. Earnshaw, professor of chromosome dynamics
