= STK12 =

STK12 may refer to:

- Aurora B kinase, an enzyme
- IkappaB kinase, an enzyme
