= Hesperadin =

Names
- Preferred IUPAC name N-[(3Z)-2-Oxo-3-(phenyl{4-[(piperidin-1-yl)methyl]anilino}methylidene)-2,3-dihydro-1H-indol-5-yl]ethanesulfonamide

Identifiers
CAS Number	422513-13-1
3D model (JSmol)	Interactive image
ChemSpider	8318096
PubChem CID	10142586
UNII	PTR491OS14
CompTox Dashboard (EPA)	DTXSID00195086
- InChI: InChI=1S/C29H32N4O3S/c1-2-37(35,36)32-24-15-16-26-25(19-24)27(29(34)31-26)28(22-9-5-3-6-10-22)30-23-13-11-21(12-14-23)20-33-17-7-4-8-18-33/h3,5-6,9-16,19,30,32H,2,4,7-8,17-18,20H2,1H3,(H,31,34)/b28-27- Key: GLDSKRNGVVYJAB-DQSJHHFOSA-N; InChI=1/C29H32N4O3S/c1-2-37(35,36)32-24-15-16-26-25(19-24)27(29(34)31-26)28(22-9-5-3-6-10-22)30-23-13-11-21(12-14-23)20-33-17-7-4-8-18-33/h3,5-6,9-16,19,30,32H,2,4,7-8,17-18,20H2,1H3,(H,31,34)/b28-27- Key: GLDSKRNGVVYJAB-DQSJHHFOBF
- SMILES: CCS(=O)(=O)NC1=CC2=C(C=C1)NC(=O)C2=C(C3=CC=CC=C3)NC4=CC=C(C=C4)CN5CCCCC5

Properties
Chemical formula	C_{29}H_{32}N_{4}O_{3}S
Molar mass	516.66 g·mol^{−1}
- Except where otherwise noted, data are given for materials in their standard state (at 25 °C [77 °F], 100 kPa). verify (what is ?) Infobox references

Hesperadin is an aurora kinase inhibitor.

The small molecule inhibits chromosome alignment and segregation by limiting the function of mitotic kinases Aurora B and Aurora A. Hesperadin causes cells to enter anaphase much faster, sometimes before the chromosomes are properly bi-oriented.

Hesperadin, like other miotic inhibitors, limits and sometimes can stop the process of mitosis in cells. For this reason, some have considered hesperadin's potential as a cancer-preventing drug.

Hesperadin works as an inhibitor, attaching to the active sites of Aurora A and Aurora B kinases.
