= Lenox School for Boys =

Lenox School
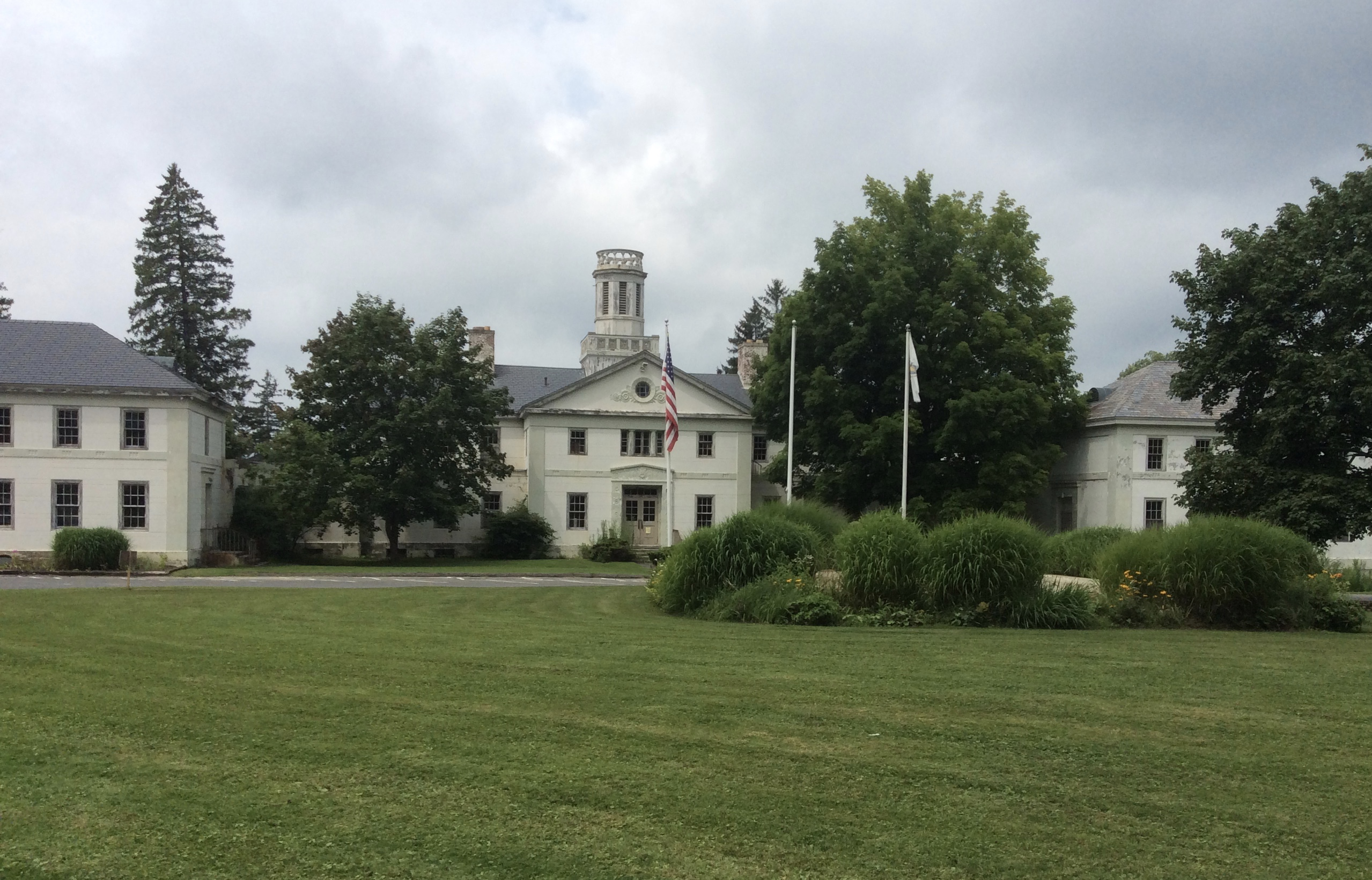
- St. Martin's Hall

Location
- Lenox, Massachusetts; United States; 42°20′58″N 73°16′59″W

Information
- Type: Independent boarding & day high school
- Motto: Latin: Non Ministrari sed Ministrare (Not to be served but to serve)
- Religious affiliation: Christianity
- Denomination: Episcopal
- Established: 1926
- Founder: G. Gardner Monks
- Status: Closed
- Closed: 1972
- Grades: 9-12
- Campus type: Rural

Lenox School was an Episcopal independent, college-preparatory boarding school for boys in grades nine through twelve in Lenox, Massachusetts, in the United States.

== History ==
The school opened in 1926 under the leadership of Rev. G. Gardner Monks, the school's first headmaster. Monks' son Robert A. G. Monks was born while he and his wife served the school. In 1946, Robert L. Curry became the second and longest-serving headmaster, leaving in 1969. Over the years, Lenox's enrollment ranged from 150 to 250 boys, with about 32 teachers or masters. The school was modeled on the U.K. school system, using 'forms' rather than 'grades'. The third form referred to the first year, sixth form for the senior year. The school used a prefectorial system of sixth form members elected by the senior class or appointed by the headmaster.

The school was primarily boarding, with some day students commuting from the surrounding region of the central Berkshire Hills. Episcopal influence was administered by several clergy faculty members, required sacred studies classes, and a daily chapel service at Trinity Episcopal Church. In addition to academic standards, the school was notable for its sports teams. The motto of the school was Non Ministrari-Sed Ministrare; "not to be ministered unto but to minister" or more commonly translated as "not to be served but to serve".

Eventually, financial problems led to the school's closure. A 1972 merger with the Bordentown Military Institute was an uncomfortable alliance between two disparate school cultures. By the following school year, the combined entity was closed, as the Vietnam War had reduced the popularity of military education. The fate of the school was not unique among private secondary schools in the central Berkshires. By the mid-1970s, neighboring Fox Hollow School, Windsor Mountain School, Cranwell Preparatory School (Jesuit), and Stockbridge School had all closed. Like Lenox School, these were small boarding schools serving students from throughout the northeast and sometimes beyond, occupying campuses that were once grand estates, often referred to as 'Berkshire Cottages' by their seasonal Gilded Age occupants.

The core of the school's campus is now the site of Shakespeare & Company. An alumni organization produces a quarterly newsletter and convenes an annual fall reunion in Lenox.

== Notable alumni ==
- Robert Seamans, Deputy Administrator of NASA during the Kennedy and Johnson administrations; Secretary of the Air Force under Richard Nixon
- William Anthony Paddon, (1931) Canadian physician, author, and seventh Lieutenant Governor of Newfoundland and Labrador
- Francis G. James Sr. (1932), professor of Irish history at Tulane University for nearly 40 years
- William B. Spofford, (1938), Bishop of the Episcopal Diocese of Eastern Oregon (1969–1979), Assistant Bishop of the Episcopal Diocese of Washington (1979–1984, 1990), b. 1921, d. 2013
- Stanley Loomis, (1940), author of four books on French history
- John Allen Gable, (1961), executive director of the Theodore Roosevelt Association until his death
- Kirk Scharfenberg, (1961), journalist with the New York Times and the Boston Globe, 1984 Pulitzer Prize winner.
- Robert L. Crosby, (1961), Swift Boat captain in Vietnam, where he died, was a friend of presidential candidate John Kerry
- Clifton O. Dummett, (1961), professor of dentistry at LSU, helped integrate the New Orleans Yacht Club, known for lectures on pediatric dentistry, deceased.
- Richard Wilhelm, (1964), hotel executive with The Waldorf Astoria, St. Regis and The Plaza Hotels in NYC, President/CEO of Interbank-Brener, Island Outpost Hotels, Trust Hotels & Resorts, EVP & GM Fairfield Communities
- Nathaniel Benjamin, (1965), master wooden boat builder
- Lucien A. Hold, (1965), comedy-club talent booker & manager, helped discover & promote the early careers of New York comedians Chris Rock, Jerry Seinfeld, and Adam Sandler. Married to Vanessa Hollingshead. Deceased 2004.
- William Homans (Watermelon Slim), blues musician
- William Earnshaw, Ph.D., (1968), Professor of Chromosome Dynamics at the University of Edinburgh, Institute of Cell Biology
- Oliver (Nol) Putnam (1951) (Faculty 1960–1971), Blacksmith, forged the doors for the National Cathedral in Washington, DC and other notable works.
