= ZM447439 =

Names
- Preferred IUPAC name N-[4-({6-Methoxy-7-[3-(morpholin-4-yl)propoxy]quinazolin-4-yl}amino)phenyl]benzamide

Identifiers
CAS Number	331771-20-1
3D model (JSmol)	Interactive image
ChEBI	CHEBI:91376
ChemSpider	8090061
PubChem CID	9914412
UNII	RSN3P9776R
CompTox Dashboard (EPA)	DTXSID00186833
- InChI: InChI=1S/C29H31N5O4/c1-36-26-18-24-25(19-27(26)38-15-5-12-34-13-16-37-17-14-34)30-20-31-28(24)32-22-8-10-23(11-9-22)33-29(35)21-6-3-2-4-7-21/h2-4,6-11,18-20H,5,12-17H2,1H3,(H,33,35)(H,30,31,32) Key: OGNYUTNQZVRGMN-UHFFFAOYSA-N; InChI=1/C29H31N5O4/c1-36-26-18-24-25(19-27(26)38-15-5-12-34-13-16-37-17-14-34)30-20-31-28(24)32-22-8-10-23(11-9-22)33-29(35)21-6-3-2-4-7-21/h2-4,6-11,18-20H,5,12-17H2,1H3,(H,33,35)(H,30,31,32) Key: OGNYUTNQZVRGMN-UHFFFAOYAS
- SMILES: COC1=C(C=C2C(=C1)C(=NC=N2)NC3=CC=C(C=C3)NC(=O)C4=CC=CC=C4)OCCCN5CCOCC5

Properties
Chemical formula	C_{29}H_{31}N_{5}O_{4}
Molar mass	513.598 g·mol^{−1}
- Except where otherwise noted, data are given for materials in their standard state (at 25 °C [77 °F], 100 kPa). verify (what is ?) Infobox references

ZM447439 is an aurora inhibitor.
