= Foxhollow School =

Fox Hollow School

Location
- Lenox, Massachusetts
- 42.3238°N 73.281°W

Information
- Type: private secondary school
- Established: 1930
- Closed: 1976
- Headmistress: Aileen M. Farrell
- Grades: 9-12

The Foxhollow School was a private boarding school for girls. Founded by Aileen M. Farrell in 1930 on the Foxhollow Farm in Rhinebeck, New York. The school was moved to the Lenox, Massachusetts former estate of the Alfred Gwynne Vanderbilt family. The school expanded to the neighboring property, The Mount. Miss Farrell was a British citizen and Oxford University graduate, who never sought American citizenship. She led the school for forty years until 1970. The school closed in 1976 and the property became an inn. In 2017, it was announced the building would be converted to luxury apartments.

Foxhollow School was one of several private secondary schools in the vicinity that occupied the properties of Gilded Age estates to close in the 1970s. These schools included Stockbridge School, Windsor Mountain School, Lenox School for Boys and Cranwell Preparatory School. The costs of maintaining these grand Berkshire Cottages and their sprawling grounds was one of the contributing causes of their closures.

== Notable alumni ==
- Joan W. Patten
