= Tozasertib =

Names
- Preferred IUPAC name N-[4-({4-(4-Methylpiperazin-1-yl)-6-[(5-methyl-1H-pyrazol-3-yl)amino]pyrimidin-2-yl}sulfanyl)phenyl]cyclopropanecarboxamide

Identifiers
CAS Number	639089-54-6
3D model (JSmol)	Interactive image
ChemSpider	4591897
IUPHAR/BPS	5718
KEGG	D08279
PubChem CID	5494449
UNII	234335M86K
CompTox Dashboard (EPA)	DTXSID10213609
- InChI: InChI=1S/C23H28N8OS/c1-15-13-20(29-28-15)25-19-14-21(31-11-9-30(2)10-12-31)27-23(26-19)33-18-7-5-17(6-8-18)24-22(32)16-3-4-16/h5-8,13-14,16H,3-4,9-12H2,1-2H3,(H,24,32)(H2,25,26,27,28,29) Key: GCIKSSRWRFVXBI-UHFFFAOYSA-N; InChI=1/C23H28N8OS/c1-15-13-20(29-28-15)25-19-14-21(31-11-9-30(2)10-12-31)27-23(26-19)33-18-7-5-17(6-8-18)24-22(32)16-3-4-16/h5-8,13-14,16H,3-4,9-12H2,1-2H3,(H,24,32)(H2,25,26,27,28,29) Key: GCIKSSRWRFVXBI-UHFFFAOYAL
- SMILES: CC1=CC(=NN1)NC2=NC(=NC(=C2)N3CCN(CC3)C)SC4=CC=C(C=C4)NC(=O)C5CC5

Properties
Chemical formula	C_{23}H_{28}N_{8}OS
Molar mass	464.59 g·mol^{−1}
- Except where otherwise noted, data are given for materials in their standard state (at 25 °C [77 °F], 100 kPa). verify (what is ?) Infobox references

Tozasertib (VX-680) is an aurora kinase inhibitor.
