= Aurora inhibitor =

Putative drug class for treating cancer

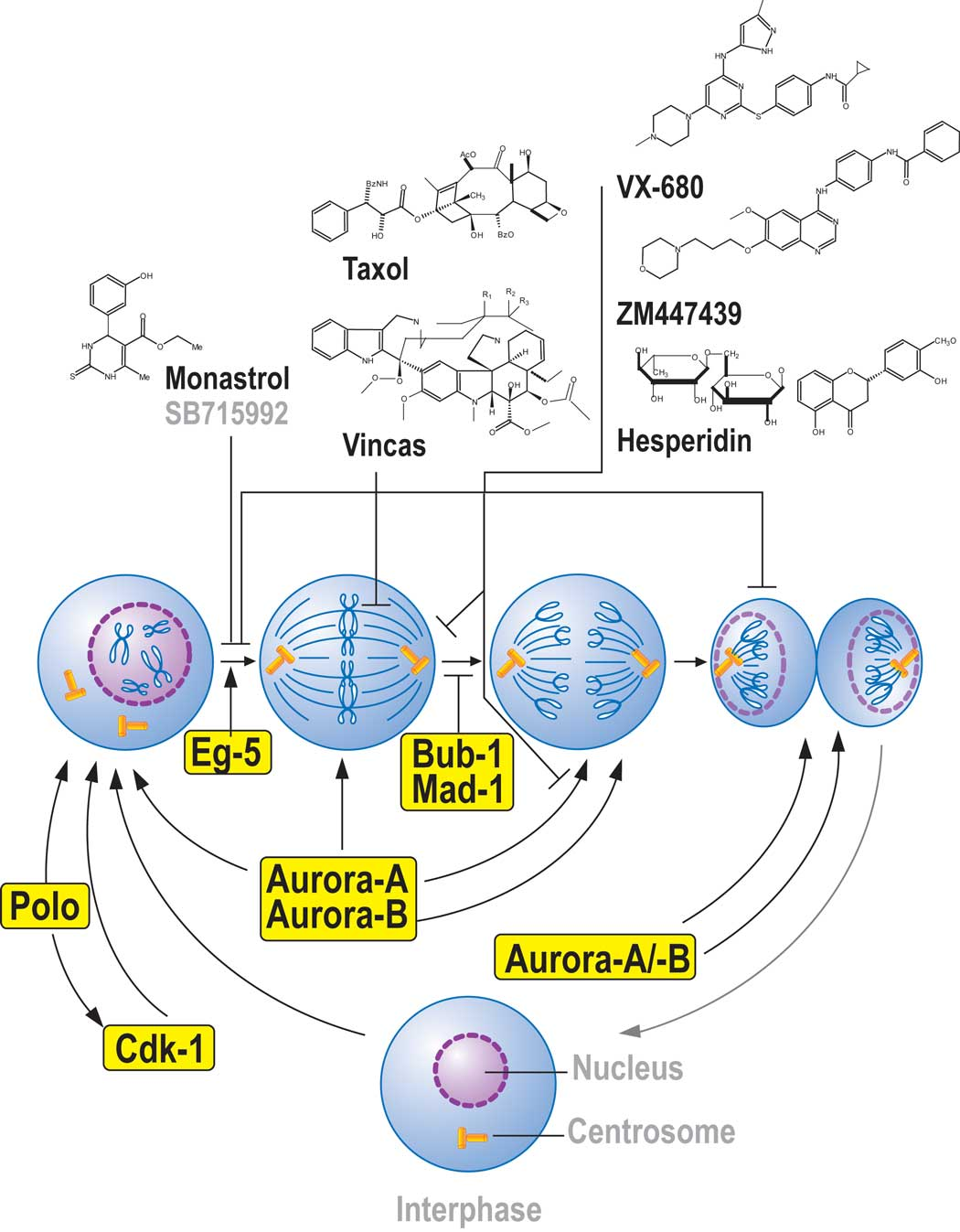
Aurora case study – six inhibitors and their action during cytokinesis

Aurora kinase inhibitors are a putative drug class for treating cancer. The Aurora kinase enzymes could be potential targets for novel small-molecule enzyme inhibitors.

Aurora kinases regulate cell cycle transit from G2 through cytokinesis, and thus are targets in cancer therapy. There are three mammalian aurora kinase genes, encoding aurora A, B and C. Intense investigation has focused on aurora A and B as they appear to play a role in oncogenesis with aurora A identified as a low penetrance tumor susceptibility gene in mice and humans.

== Drug development ==
A new approach to inhibiting cancer growth that shows great promise for structure-based drug development is targeting enzymes central to cellular mitosis. Aurora kinases, so named because the scattered mitotic spindles generated by mutant forms resemble the Aurora Borealis, have gained a great deal of attention as possible anticancer drug targets. The Aurora enzymes are particularly significant because they are involved in a direct path to the nucleosome by phosphorylating histone H3. Furthermore, Aurora kinases are known to be oncogenic and overexpressed in various forms of cancerous growth, including leukemia, colon cancer, prostate cancer and breast cancer tumors.

So far three Aurora-kinase inhibitors have been described: ZM447439, hesperadin and VX-680. The last is in advanced stages (Phase II clinical trial) of a joint drug development by Vertex Pharmaceuticals's VX-680 (Sausville, 234, last posted on 12/18/06) and Merck & Co., although the Phase II clinical trial was suspended in November, 2007 due to QT prolongation observed in one patient in Phase I trial.

ZM447439

Hesperadin

VX-680

== Aurora structure ==
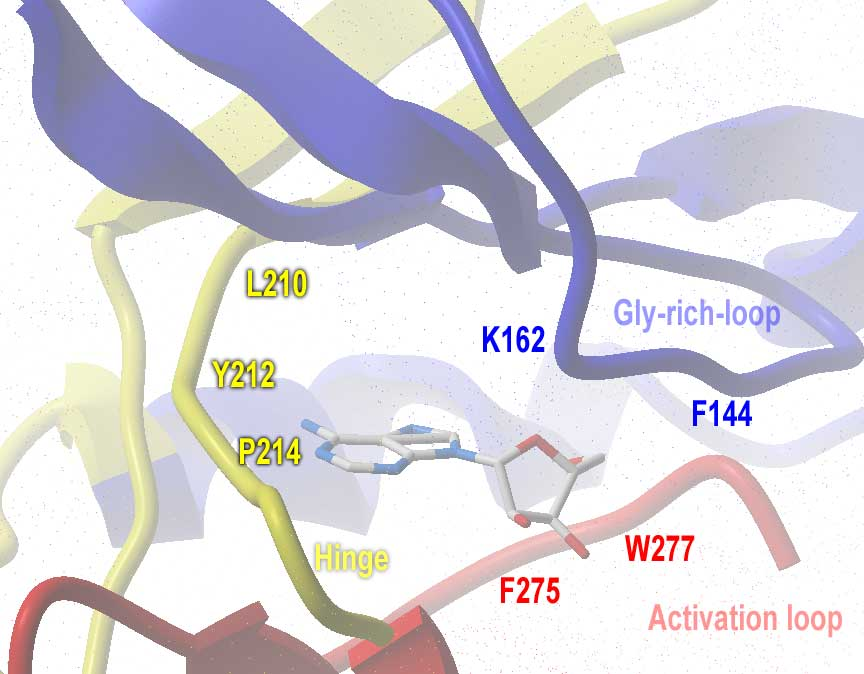
Aurora's active center

The structure and active site of Aurora-2-adenosine complex has been determined. The hinge (yellow), glycine-rich loop (blue), and activation loop (red) are key features of the protein kinase fold involved in binding adenosine. The protein backbone atoms of residues Glu-211, Ala-213 in the hinge region of Aurora-2, and the sidechain of residue Trp-277, located in the activation loop, bind adenosine through specific hydrogen bonds. There are no hydrogen bonds between the 2'-OH or 3'-OH groups of the ribose moiety and Aurora-2. Residues Lys-162 and Asp-274 are essential for Aurora-2 kinase activity but do not hydrogen bond to each other as seen in crystal structures of several other protein kinases.

== See also ==
- Kinome
- Cyclin-dependent kinase
- Signal transduction
