= Joan W. Patten =

American sculptor and scholar

Joan Wholly Patten (1924–2005) was an American sculptor and scholar of Mayan art.

== Early life and education ==
Patten was born in New York City on June 5, 1924. She was one of two children of Willam Francis and Elsa Brainin Wholly who ran an office furnishings business in New York City and maintained an upper-class standard of living. She attended the Fox Hollow School for girls in Lenox, Massachusetts, as well as The Hewitt School in New York City. At age ten, a friend of her parents, the American sculptor Gutzon Borglum, suggested she study with the American sculptor Harriet Whitney Frishmuth; she studied with him for the next six years. She finished her formal education at the Columbia University Graduate School of Art (1946-1950) where she studied art with a concentration in sculpture under Oronzio Meldarelli and Doug Kingman. After her formal training, she continued with sculpted portraiture and was commissioned to make several bronze portraits of various US personalities. She also fashioned bas relief portraits which she then reduced from full-size to miniatures, to be used as medals and pendants.

== Family life ==
In 1947 she married William V. Patten in New York City, and had two sons. The family soon traded New York City for Guatemala City. In 1963, Joan's husband moved to Guatemala City with his eldest son to work for the US Agency for International Development (USAID) s, and was hired by R.O.C.A.P. to do research on marketing and natural resources. she followed with her second son in 1965.

== Work in Guatemala ==
She began to explore the ancient heritage and native Maya of Guatemala. Becoming fascinated by the Classic Maya sculpture in the many nearby ancient Maya ruins, she began investigating the ancient art. In these early years, tourists were allowed at some ruins to make rubbings of stone monuments. So as a pastime, she made rubbings (or calcos as they were called) of carvings located on a friend's finca. Joan and a companion were later allowed to make a few rubbings of Monuments at Tikal and she found that her sculptor's touch and eye were well suited for the craft. While practicing rubbings, Joan became intrigued by the idea of fashioning molds of the stones and creating replicas. It occurred to her that, as a sculptor, she could put her talents to good use and help preserve the nation's cultural treasures that were under constant threat due to exposure to the elements and theft.

With the help of her husband's connections, Patten suggested to the government authorities that they make casts of the monuments to preserve and protect Maya sculpture. Officials agreed, and she quickly found herself elected to do the job. The director of INGUAT (National Tourist Office of Guatemala) became enthused with the idea of monument reproductions and helped Joan to obtain the proper government permissions to start the task. Over the next decade, she became the only Guatemalan authorized agent to make official reproductions from any Maya site. The reproduction of Maya monuments soon became the dominant passion of her life and she would spend the next seventeen years (until 1982 when she returned to the United States) pursuing opportunities to cast replicas of Maya sculpture.

== Restoration efforts ==
Patten donated the casts she made to the Guatemalan government as well as her time and expertise. When the 1976 Guatemala earthquake occurred, many of the ancient monuments housed in museums were broken. Joan was called in and asked if she could help restore the monuments. She gladly accepted the offer and was able to make molds of the stelae broken parts. These pieces were then fitted together into a new mold that was later fashioned to make an unbroken replica. Through the years, the Guatemala Museum of History and Anthropology received seventy of Patten's reproductions and the Popol Vuh Museum received approximately fifteen sculptures. Today, many of these casts are on display along a garden pathway within Francisco Marroquín University adjoining the Popol Vuh Museum.

== Rubbings ==
As Joan made molds, she in turn made rubbings from the original work; these were fashioned before and after casting to record that no harm had come to the stone. Having the governmental permission but little monies to support the work, she began to sell the rubbings to finance more expeditions into more Maya sites and she soon became one of the best practitioners of this art. However, she always considered the calcos merely a side-line to her main work as a sculptor.

Traditionally, rubbings have been made by tamping or rubbing black inks or waxes on white rice paper which are stretched over carved stone, wood or metal. With rice paper hard to come by, Joan used oil pigments lightly tamped on stretched dyed cloth. The combination of coloured fabrics and inks produced a polychromatic blueprint of the carved relief with crisp, well-defined lines outlining both figures and hieroglyphic passages.

Although Patten made rubbings from the original surface of every monument she made a replica of, a majority of duplicate rubbings were fashioned directly from the replicas. Rubbings from the second generation casts had several advantages. First, there was no chance of harming the original stone. Also, the cast possessed a clean, tight surface free of additional wear from lichen and plant growth. Perhaps the best gain was that she could fashion a rubbing in the studio in a controlled environment (sheltered from the rain, sun and mosquitoes). In the studio she could take all the time needed to coax and transfer details of figures and hieroglyphs onto the cloth. Many times she had the added advantage of making a rubbing while looking at another cast of the same monument. The end result produced features that were telegraphed onto the cloth surface with crisp, well defined lines. The finished work often looked more like a painting or a batik than a traditional rubbing. The corpus of Patten rubbings number approximately nine hundred prints and range from single glyphic blocks to full altars and stelae.

By 29 November 1985, the Guatemalan Congress enacted a law restricting the creation of molds and rubbings of monuments. With this law, Joan's famous permission to make replicas came to an end.

== Exhibitions ==
=== Permanent exhibitions ===
- La Aurora International Airport, Guatemala City, 1972 (now uninstalled)
- Santa Lucia Park, Santa Lucia Cotzumelhuapa, Guatemala, 1974
- Instituto Turismo, Guatemala City, 1976
- Nobel Laureate Miguelangel Asturias headstone, Paris, France, 1976
- United Nations Guatemalan Cultural Park, Lago Amatitlán, Guatemala, 1976
- Hotel Dorado Americana, Guatemala City, 1978
- Olympic Stadium, Retalhuleu, Guatemala, 1980
- Duke University, Durham, North Carolina, 1980
- University of North Carolina, Winston-Salem, North Carolina, 1981
- Guatemala City Zoo, Guatemala City, 1981
- Miguelangel Asturias Park, Guatemala City, 1982
- Jacksonville Museum of Art, Jacksonville, Florida, 1983

=== Temporary exhibitions ===
- Mint Museum, Charlotte, North Carolina, 1972
- Jacksonville Museum of Art, Jacksonville, Florida, 1973 and 1983
- Galleri Seven, Ridgefield, Connecticut, 1973
- Museum of Science and Planetarium, Miami, Florida, 1974
- Glynn Art Center, Saint Simon, Georgia, 1974
- American Institute, Guatemala City, 1974 and 1978
- Oregon Museum of Art, University of Oregon, Eugene, Oregon, 1975
- Instituto Turismo, Guatemala City, 1975 and 1979
- Ministry of Education and Culture with USIF at San Salvador, El Salvador, 1976
- Congreso Nacional de Medicina, Guatemala City, 1977
- University of San Carlos, Guatemala City, 1977
- International Orchid Show, various sites, Central America, 1977
- International Flower Show, Montreal, Canada, 1978
- Hollywood Museum of Art, Hollywood, Florida, 1978
- Popol Vuh Museum, Guatemala City, currently holds approximately fifteen molds of stone sculpture, ranging from “frontier markers” to human and animal figurines

=== Corporate art commissions ===
- BankAmerica, corporate offices interior decoration, 1970-1980
- CITIBANK, corporate offices interior decoration, 1970-1980
- Nestlé Corporation, exhibitions at opening of new factory, 1971-1972

== Honours ==
- Only US citizen to receive official permission to make casts of sculpture throughout Guatemala for a period of seventeen years.
- In 1972, the artist was the first US citizen and woman to be honoured with a citation from the Commission of International Women of the OAS for her preservation work.
- In March 1973, Joan received high praise for her work when she presented General Arana Osorio, President of Guatemala, with two of her Maya rubbings in a ceremony at the Presidential Palace in Guatemala City. In his concluding remarks at the presentation, President Arana said to Joan that he thought the rubbings were not only exact representations of Maya stelae but were also true works of art.
- In 1976 she cast a replica of Seibal Stela 14 for the grave headstone of Nobel Laureate Miguel Angel Asturias buried in the Père-Lachaise cemetery at Paris France.
- For recognition of her work and contributions, Joan received an Honorary Doctorate Degree from the University of San Carlos, Guatemala in 1981.

== Publications ==
A Preliminary List of Publications Featuring Patten Casts and/or Rubbings

Beachy, Debra 1978 Stalking the stele in deepest Guatemala. BFGToday, Volume 2, Number 4, July–August 1978, pp. 17–19. 1979 Adventure. People, 22 January, pp. 22–23.

Hellmuth, Nicholas M. 1978 Tikal, Copan Travel Guide. St. Louis.

Mayer, Karl-Herbert 1981 Abaj Takalik Altar 12. Mexicon, 19 March 1981, Vol. III Nr. 1, pp. 2.

Michel, Genevieve. 1989 The Rulers of Tikal. Guatemala: Publications Vista, 1989.

Smith, Dick 1977 Joan Patten Escultora. Atracciones, La Nacion, 22 April 1977, Guatemala.

Robicsek, Francis 1978 The Smoking Gods: Tobacco in Maya Art, History, and Religion. Norman: University of Oklahoma Press, 1978. 1975 A Study in Maya Art and History: The Mat Symbol. New York: Museum the American Indian, Heye Foundation.

Beachy, Debra 1978 Stalking the stele in deepest Guatemala. BFGToday, Volume 2, Number 4, July–August 1978, pp. 17–19. 1979 Adventure. People, 22 January, pp. 22–23.

Callaway, Carl D. 2012 Rubbings of Ancient Maya Sculpture by Joan W. Patten. Mayaweb Art Press.

Smith, Dick 1977 Joan Patten Escultora. Atracciones, La Nacion, 22 April 1977, Guatemala.
