= BI 811283 =

Chemical compound

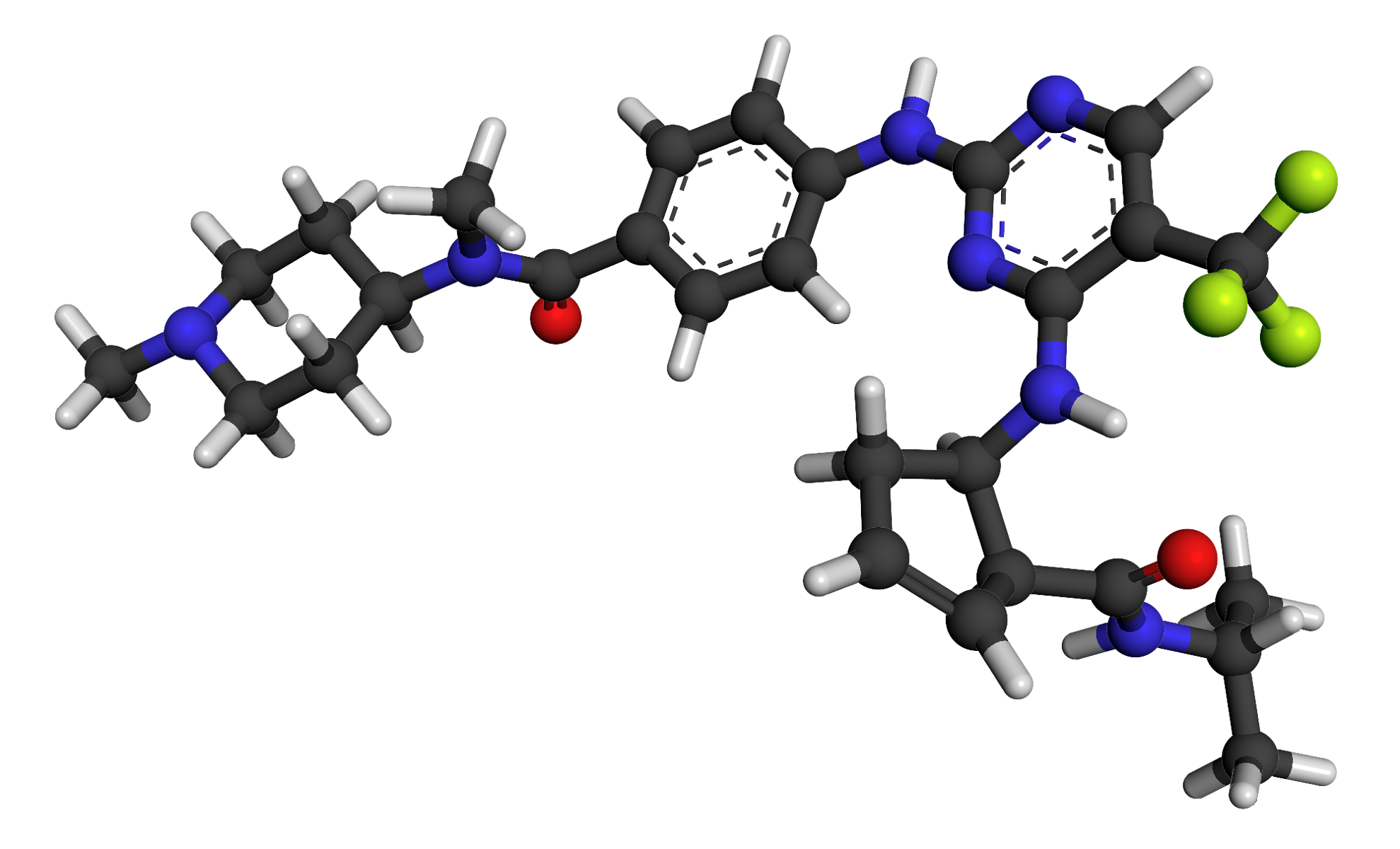

Legal status
- Legal status: Investigational

Identifiers
- IUPAC name: 4-((4-(((1R,2S)-2-(isopropylcarbamoyl)cyclopentyl)amino)-5-(trifluoromethyl)pyrimidin-2-yl)amino)-N-methyl-N-(1-methylpiperidin-4-yl)benzamide
- CAS Number: 1802182-21-3
- PubChem CID: 24811322
- ChemSpider: 59053055

Chemical and physical data
- Formula: C_{28}H_{38}F_{3}N_{7}O_{2}
- Molar mass: 561.654 g·mol^{−1}
- 3D model (JSmol): Interactive image
- SMILES: FC(F)(F)C(C=N1)=C(N[C@@]2(CCC[C@@]2(C(NC(C)C)=O)[H])[H])N=C1NC3=CC=C(C(N(C)C4CCN(C)CC4)=O)C=C3
- InChI: InChI=1S/C28H38F3N7O2/c1-17(2)33-25(39)21-6-5-7-23(21)35-24-22(28(29,30)31)16-32-27(36-24)34-19-10-8-18(9-11-19)26(40)38(4)20-12-14-37(3)15-13-20/h8-11,16-17,20-21,23H,5-7,12-15H2,1-4H3,(H,33,39)(H2,32,34,35,36)/t21-,23+/m0/s1; Key:JYFHHSWWLYUOIG-JTHBVZDNSA-N

BI 811283 is a small molecule inhibitor of the Aurora B kinase protein being developed by Boehringer Ingelheim for use as an anti-cancer agent. BI 811283 is currently in the early stages of clinical development and is undergoing first in human trials in patients with solid tumors and acute myeloid leukemia.

== Mechanism of action ==
BI 811283 is a small molecule drug that selectively binds to the ATP binding pocket of Aurora B kinase, inhibiting its function in cell division. The Aurora B kinase protein (also known as STK12) is one of a family of proteins that plays an essential role in the alignment, movement and separation of chromosomes during cell division. Aurora B kinase is produced in all dividing cells in normal tissue however; the levels of Aurora B kinase are abnormally raised in many types of cancer. Abnormally elevated levels of Aurora B kinase, cause unequal chromosomal separation during cell division, resulting in the formation of cells with abnormal numbers of chromosomes, which are both a cause and driver of cancer.

Inhibition of Aurora B kinase by BI 811283 in cancer cells leads to the formation of cells with severely abnormal numbers of chromosomes (polyploid). Counterintuitively, inhibition of Aurora B kinase by BI 811283 actually causes the polyploid cells formed to continue dividing however, because these cells have severe chromosomal abnormalities, they eventually stop dividing or undergo cell death.

== Clinical Uses ==
BI 811283 is currently undergoing investigation in phase 1 and 2 trials and has yet to be licensed by the FDA. BI 811283 may be active in a range of malignancies that are known to have raised levels of Aurora B kinase including; non-small cell lung, brain, head and neck, colorectal and ovarian cancer, where it is associated with worse treatment outcome and poorer overall survival.

Further phase 1 and 2 trials are underway investigating the use of BI 811283 in patients with different types of advanced solid tumours and Acute Myeloid Leukaemia.

== Adverse effects ==
Traditional anti-cancer agents that block cell division commonly cause severe adverse effects. BI 811283 has been developed to selectively target dividing cells, therefore reducing the severity of adverse effects experience by patients. The most common and severe side effect experienced with BI 811283 is a reduction in the number of white blood cells (leucopenia and neutropenia) which occurs in between 17-42% of patients and can increase the risk of infections and fever.

== Studies ==
Pre-clinical studies have demonstrated that BI 811283 selectively binds to and inhibits the Aurora B kinase protein leading to inhibition of growth and senescence in lung cancer cells in vitro. Furthermore, BI 811283 also inhibits the growth of pancreatic, colorectal and non-small cell lung cancer cells in vivo leading to tumour shrinkage.

First in man clinical trials have demonstrated that BI 811283 is safe and stable in the blood stream. Two early clinical trials have reported that BI 811283 has anti-tumour activity, preventing the progression of cancer in between 29-33% of patients with advanced solid tumours.
