= Syntelic =

Chromosome attachment pattern in cytogenetics

Syntelic attachment occurs when both sister chromosomes are attached to a single spindle pole.

Normal cell division distributes the genome equally between two daughter cells, with each chromosome attaching to an ovoid structure called the spindle. During the division process, errors commonly occur in attaching the chromosomes to the spindle, estimated to affect 86 to 90 percent of chromosomes.

Such attachment errors are common during the early stages of spindle formation, but they are mostly corrected before the start of anaphase. Successful cell division requires identification and correction of any dangerous errors before the cell splits in two. If the syntelic attachment continues, it causes both sister chromatids to be segregated to a single daughter cell.

== Causes ==
Microtubules extend from the spindle poles and attach to the first kinetochore they encounter. Because this process is stochastic and not facilitated or directed, the first microtubules to come into contact with a kinetochore may not have originated at the correct spindle pole. Normally, the sister kinetochores are on opposing sides of the chromosomes, facing outward toward their respective spindle poles. This arrangement enhances the likelihood of properly bi-oriented chromosomes and is sometimes referred to as a mechanism for 'avoidance' of syntelic attachment. However, sometimes the kinetochores are found on the same side of the centromere, and this error cannot be corrected stochastically. Instead, the spindle must actively exert forces on one of the two kinetochores to relocate it to the proper, outer edge of the centromere. If the geometry and orientation of the two kinetochores is not corrected, the cells can still effectively achieve bi-orientation through the employment of error correction mechanisms.

Polyploid cells, and tetraploids in particular, experience an increased number of syntelic attachments, which contributes to their genomic instability. This phenomenon of increased rates of syntelic attachment in polyploids is thought to result from an inability to scale the mitotic spindle and kinetochore architecture to accommodate the increase in cell size. Therefore, scaling defects between the genome and cellular architecture, which often occur in cancer, likely result in high rates of syntelic attachment.

== Error correction ==
Error correction is closely tied to the spindle assembly checkpoint (SAC), which oversees the progression through mitosis and can halt the cell in metaphase until proper bi-orientation of all chromosomes is achieved. Initial attachments occur randomly, and the cell destabilizes any incorrect microtubule-kinetochore interactions. Subsequent rounds of undirected attachment and destabilization occur until each kinetochore is attached to the correct spindle pole.

Tension was quickly identified as an important component of the error-sensing mechanism and likely of the spindle assembly checkpoint. Ipl1 in yeast and its functional homolog, Aurora B, in metazoans aid in tension detection and destabilization of errant attachments. Aurora B is found at the centromere, between the two kinetochores. In the absence of tension, Aurora B can phosphorylate substrates at the kinetochores, leading to destabilization of the attached microtubules. Properly attached microtubules induce tension, pulling the kinetochore far enough away from Aurora B so as to prevent phosphorylation of kinetochore components. Following destabilization, the kinetochore can form new spindle attachments, and if the new attachments result in chromosome bi-orientation, they will remain. Correct attachments that induce tension are more likely to occur when the kinetochores are geometrically positioned on opposite sides of the centromere.

Robust destabilization by Ipl1/Aurora B in the absence of tension leads to a specific challenge: the initial establishment of bi-orientation, prior to the buildup of tension, would be sensitive to Ipl1/Aurora B activity. This is referred to as the initiation problem of biorientation (IPBO), and is resolved by implementing a delay between sensing the tension and destabilizing the attachment. Modeling has indicated that such a delay could be introduced if the rate of Ipl1/Aurora B kinase activity is slower than that of the counteracting phosphatase activity at the kinetochore. The time delay allows for tension to be established at bi-oriented chromosomes, so that only syntelic attachments are phosphorylated and destabilized.

== Consequences ==
Syntelic attachment is not uncommon in early metaphase, and can often be resolved by error correction mechanisms that are well-conserved across metazoans. If syntelic attachment is left uncorrected, for example if the spindle assembly checkpoint does not successfully pause cells in metaphase, the chromosomes will not segregate correctly. This failure to properly segregate results in aneuploidy, which can lead to errors in development or cancer. Interestingly, segregation errors that result from syntelic attachment often occur without visible lagging. In contrast, merotelic attachments will cause chromosome lagging during anaphase, but will often segregate correctly and not result in aneuploidy.

== See also ==
- Spindle checkpoint
- Kinetochore
- Spindle apparatus
