= Inner centromere protein =

Protein found in humans

INCENP

Identifiers
- Aliases: INCENP, inner centromere protein
- External IDs: OMIM: 604411; MGI: 1313288; GeneCards: INCENP
Available structures
PDB	Ortholog search: PDBe RCSB
PDB	List of PDB id codes 2QFA, 4AF3

Gene location (Human)
Chr.	Chromosome 11 (human)
Band	11q12.3	Start	62,123,998 bp
Band	11q12.3	End	62,153,169 bp

Gene location (Mouse)
Chr.	Chromosome 19 (mouse)
Band	19 A|19 6.1 cM	Start	9,849,660 bp
Band	19 A|19 6.1 cM	End	9,876,915 bp
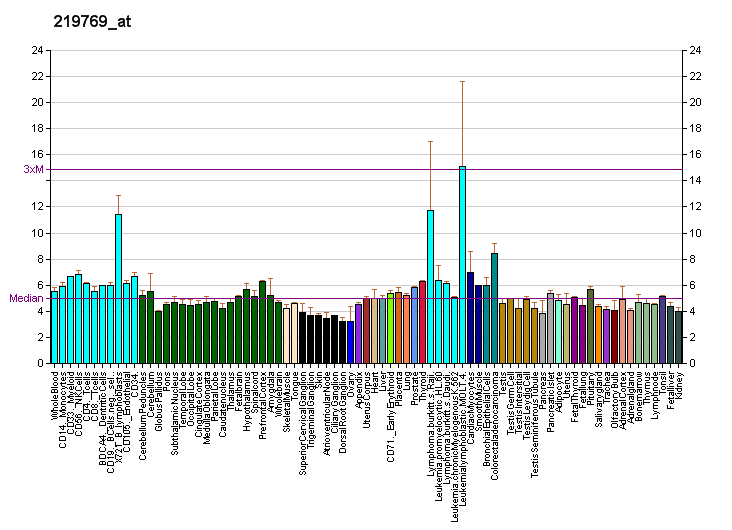
RNA expression pattern
Bgee	Human / Mouse (ortholog); Top expressed in: ventricular zone; ganglionic eminence; sural nerve; bone marrow cell; mucosa of esophagus; cerebellar hemisphere; right hemisphere of cerebellum; stromal cell of endometrium; testicle; prefrontal cortex / Top expressed in: Paneth cell; condyle; fossa; ureter; primitive streak; fetal liver hematopoietic progenitor cell; renal corpuscle; Rostral migratory stream; primary oocyte; internal carotid artery; More reference expression data
BioGPS	More reference expression data
Gene ontology
Molecular function	protein binding
Cellular component	cytoplasm; central element; pericentric heterochromatin; spindle; nucleoplasm; lateral element; chromosome; chromocenter; synaptonemal complex; chromosome, centromeric region; microtubule; cytoskeleton; kinetochore; nucleus; cytosol; nuclear body; midbody; protein-containing complex
Biological process	chromosome segregation; cell division; cell cycle; mitotic cytokinesis; mitotic sister chromatid segregation; regulation of mitotic cytokinesis
Sources:Amigo / QuickGO
Orthologs
Databases	NCBI: entry; OMA: entry
Species	Human	Mouse
Entrez	3619	16319
Ensembl	ENSG00000149503	ENSMUSG00000024660
UniProt	Q9NQS7	Q9WU62
RefSeq (mRNA)	NM_001040694; NM_020238	NM_016692; NM_001369356
RefSeq (protein)	NP_001035784; NP_064623	NP_057901
Location (UCSC)	Chr 11: 62.12 – 62.15 Mb	Chr 19: 9.85 – 9.88 Mb
PubMed search
- Wikidata
View/Edit Human	View/Edit Mouse

Chromosome passenger complex (CPC) protein INCENP N terminal

Identifiers
- Symbol: INCENP_N
- Pfam: PF12178
- InterPro: IPR022006
Available protein structures:
- PDB: IPR022006 PF12178 (ECOD; PDBsum)
- AlphaFold: IPR022006; PF12178

Inner centromere protein, ARK binding region

Identifiers
- Symbol: INCENP_ARK-bind
- Pfam: PF03941
- InterPro: IPR005635
Available protein structures:
- PDB: IPR005635 PF03941 (ECOD; PDBsum)
- AlphaFold: IPR005635; PF03941

Inner centromere protein is a protein that in humans is encoded by the INCENP gene. It is a regulatory protein in the chromosome passenger complex (CPC). It is involved in regulation of the catalytic proteins Aurora B and Aurora C. It acts in association with two other proteins - Survivin and Borealin. These proteins form a tight three-helical bundle. The N-terminal domain of INCENP is the domain involved in formation of this three-helical bundle while its C-terminal domain is responsible for the interaction with Aurora B.

In mammalian cells, two broad groups of centromere-interacting proteins have been described: constitutively binding centromere proteins and 'passenger' (or transiently interacting) proteins. The constitutive proteins include CENPA (centromere protein A), CENPB, CENPC1, and CENPD.

The term 'passenger proteins' encompasses a broad collection of proteins that localize to the centromere during specific stages of the cell cycle. These include CENPE; MCAK; KID; cytoplasmic dynein (e.g., DYNC1H1); CliPs (e.g. CLIP1); and CENPF/mitosin (CENPF). The inner centromere proteins (INCENPs), the initial members of the passenger protein group, display a broad localization along chromosomes in the early stages of mitosis but gradually become concentrated at centromeres as the cell cycle progresses into mid-metaphase. During telophase, the proteins are located within the midbody in the intercellular bridge, where they are discarded after cytokinesis.

== Interactions ==
INCENP has been shown to interact with H2AFZ, Survivin and CDCA8. The ARK binding region has been found to be necessary and sufficient for binding to aurora-related kinase. This interaction has been implicated in the coordination of chromosome segregation with cell division in yeast.
