= Aurora kinase =

Class of enzymes

Aurora kinases are serine/threonine kinases that are essential for cell proliferation. They are phosphotransferase enzymes that help the dividing cell dispense its genetic materials to its daughter cells. More specifically, Aurora kinases play a crucial role in cellular division by controlling chromatid segregation. Defects in this segregation can cause genetic instability, a condition which is highly associated with tumorigenesis. The first aurora kinases were identified in Drosophila melanogaster, where mutations led to failure of centrosome separation with the monopolar spindles reminiscent of the North Pole, suggesting the name aurora.

Three Aurora kinases have been identified in mammalian cells to date. Besides being implicated as mitotic regulators, these three kinases have generated significant interest in the cancer research field due to their elevated expression profiles in many human cancers. The human Aurora kinases present a similar domain organization, with a N-terminal domain of 39–129 residues in length, a related Ser/Thr protein kinase domain and a short C-terminal domain containing 15–20 residues. The N-terminal domain of three proteins share low sequence conservation, which determines selectivity during protein–protein interactions.

== Classes ==
As described above, there are three classes of aurora kinases in multicellular organisms, including humans:

- Aurora A (a.k.a. Aurora 2) functions during prophase of mitosis and is required for correct duplication and separation of the centrosomes (the microtubule organising centres in eukaryotic cells). Aurora A activity is positively-regulated by the spindle protein TPX2, and has recently been shown to be a target for thiol-containing molecules, such as Coenzyme A.
- Aurora B (a.k.a. Aurora 1) functions in the attachment of the mitotic spindle to the centromere.
- Aurora C (AURKC) works in germ-line cells and little is known about its function.

== See also ==
- Aurora inhibitor
