= DPYS =

Protein-coding gene in the species Homo sapiens

Available structures
PDB	Ortholog search: PDBe RCSB
PDB	List of PDB id codes 2VR2

Identifiers
- Aliases: DPYS, dihydropyrimidinase, DHP, DHPase
- External IDs: OMIM: 613326; MGI: 1928679; HomoloGene: 20359; GeneCards: DPYS; OMA:DPYS - orthologs

Gene location (Human)
Chr.	Chromosome 8 (human)
Band	8q22.3	Start	104,330,324 bp
Band	8q22.3	End	104,467,055 bp

Gene location (Mouse)
Chr.	Chromosome 15 (mouse)
Band	15|15 B3.1	Start	39,631,883 bp
Band	15|15 B3.1	End	39,720,866 bp
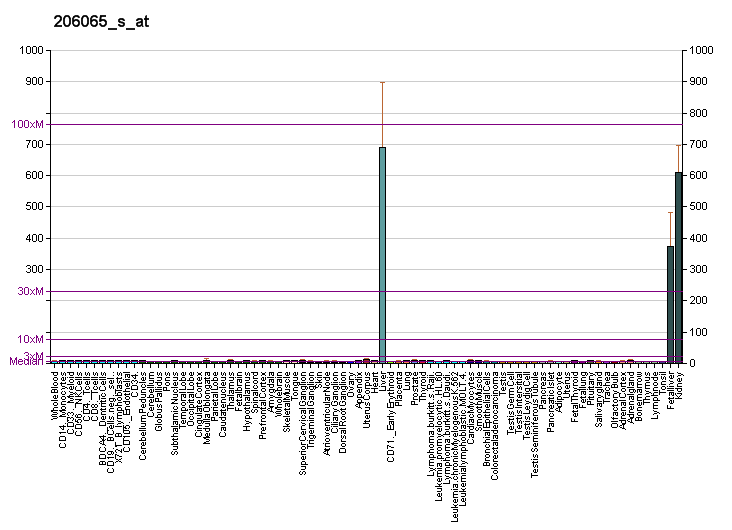
RNA expression pattern
Bgee	Human / Mouse (ortholog); Top expressed in: right lobe of liver; kidney tubule; glomerulus; metanephric glomerulus; human kidney; right adrenal cortex; left adrenal cortex; testicle; gonad; mucosa of paranasal sinus / Top expressed in: left lobe of liver; primary oocyte; proximal tubule; right kidney; respiratory epithelium; olfactory epithelium; zygote; secondary oocyte; embryo; spermatid; More reference expression data
BioGPS	More reference expression data
Gene ontology
Molecular function	amino acid binding; zinc ion binding; metal ion binding; dihydropyrimidinase activity; phosphoprotein binding; hydrolase activity, acting on carbon-nitrogen (but not peptide) bonds; thymine binding; uracil binding; hydrolase activity
Cellular component	cytoplasm; cytosol; extracellular exosome
Biological process	beta-alanine metabolic process; uracil catabolic process; pyrimidine nucleoside catabolic process; uracil metabolic process; pyrimidine nucleobase catabolic process; protein homooligomerization; protein homotetramerization; thymine catabolic process
Sources:Amigo / QuickGO
Orthologs
Species	Human	Mouse
Entrez	1807	64705
Ensembl	ENSG00000147647	ENSMUSG00000022304
UniProt	Q14117	Q9EQF5
RefSeq (mRNA)	NM_001385	NM_001164466; NM_022722
RefSeq (protein)	NP_001376	NP_001157938; NP_073559
Location (UCSC)	Chr 8: 104.33 – 104.47 Mb	Chr 15: 39.63 – 39.72 Mb
PubMed search
- Wikidata
View/Edit Human	View/Edit Mouse

Dihydropyrimidinase is an enzyme that in humans is encoded by the DPYS gene.

Dihydropyrimidinase catalyzes the conversion of 5,6-dihydrouracil to 3-ureidopropionate in pyrimidine metabolism. Dihydropyrimidinase is expressed at a high level in liver and kidney as a major 2.5-kb transcript and a minor 3.8-kb transcript. Defects in the DPYS gene are linked to dihydropyrimidinuria.

== Interactive pathway map ==
Click on genes, proteins and metabolites below to link to respective articles. (Note: The interactive pathway map can be edited at WikiPathways: "FluoropyrimidineActivity_WP1601".)

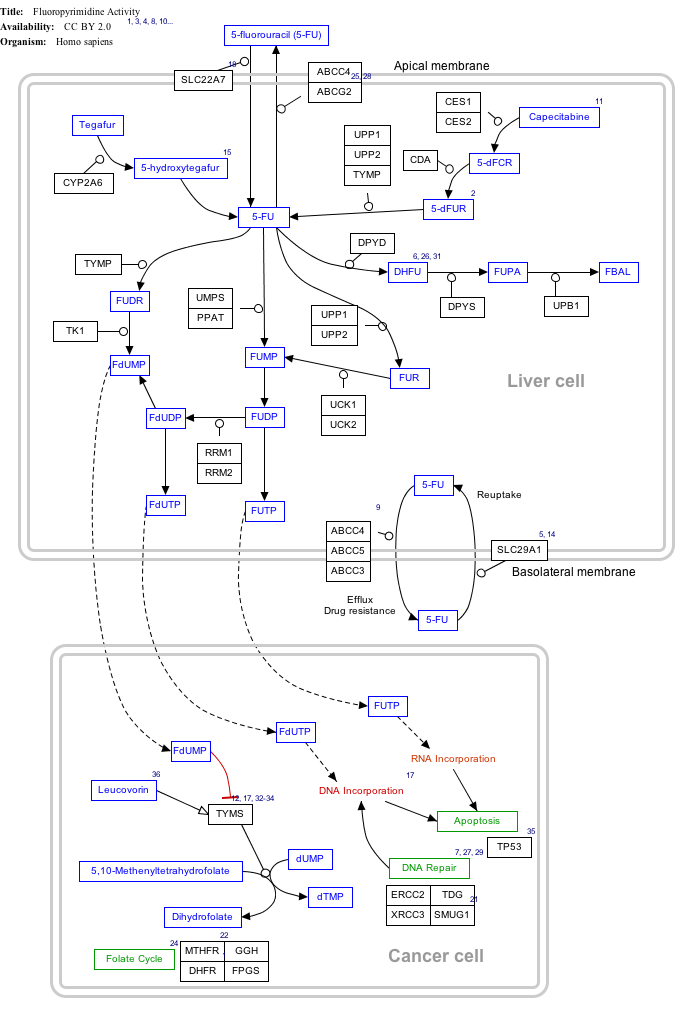

Fluorouracil (5-FU) Activity edit
