= DPY19L2 =

Protein-coding gene in humans

Identifiers
- Aliases: DPY19L2, SPATA34, SPGF9, dpy-19 like 2
- External IDs: OMIM: 613893; MGI: 2444662; HomoloGene: 77569; GeneCards: DPY19L2; OMA:DPY19L2 - orthologs

Gene location (Human)
Chr.	Chromosome 12 (human)
Band	12q14.2	Start	63,558,913 bp
Band	12q14.2	End	63,668,939 bp

Gene location (Mouse)
Chr.	Chromosome 9 (mouse)
Band	9|9 A4	Start	24,468,343 bp
Band	9|9 A4	End	24,607,589 bp
RNA expression pattern
Bgee	Human / Mouse (ortholog); Top expressed in: apex of heart; popliteal artery; tibial arteries; right auricle of heart; sperm; right testis; left ventricle; left testis; right ovary; left ovary / Top expressed in: spermatocyte; spermatid; seminiferous tubule; morula; embryo; secondary oocyte; primary oocyte; trigeminal ganglion; triceps brachii muscle; lobe of prostate; More reference expression data
BioGPS	n/a
Gene ontology
Molecular function	transferase activity; mannosyltransferase activity; glycosyltransferase activity
Cellular component	integral component of membrane; nuclear inner membrane; membrane; nucleus
Biological process	multicellular organism development; cell differentiation; protein C-linked glycosylation via 2'-alpha-mannosyl-L-tryptophan; spermatogenesis; spermatid development
Sources:Amigo / QuickGO
Orthologs
Species	Human	Mouse
Entrez	283417	320752
Ensembl	ENSG00000177990	ENSMUSG00000085576
UniProt	Q6NUT2	P0CW70
RefSeq (mRNA)	NM_173812	NM_001166207
RefSeq (protein)	NP_776173	NP_001159679
Location (UCSC)	Chr 12: 63.56 – 63.67 Mb	Chr 9: 24.47 – 24.61 Mb
PubMed search
- Wikidata
View/Edit Human	View/Edit Mouse

Dpy-19-like 2 (C. elegans) is a protein that in humans is encoded by the DPY19L2 gene.

== Function ==
The C. elegans gene dpy-19 belongs to the dpy ("dumpy" phenotype) gene class and encodes DPY-19, transmembrane protein with C-linked mannosyltransferase activity. In humans, it is highly expressed in testis, and is required for sperm head elongation and acrosome formation during spermatogenesis. Mutations in this gene are associated with an infertility disorder, spermatogenic failure type 9 (SPGF9).
