= Aurora kinase B =

Protein

AURKB

Identifiers
- Aliases: AURKB, AIK2, AIM-1, AIM1, ARK2, AurB, IPL1, PPP1R48, STK12, STK5, aurkb-sv1, aurkb-sv2, aurora kinase B, STK-1, ARK-2
- External IDs: OMIM: 604970; MGI: 107168; GeneCards: AURKB
Available structures
PDB	Ortholog search: PDBe RCSB
PDB	List of PDB id codes 4AF3
Enzyme activity
EC #	BRENDA	ExPASy	KEGG	MetaCyc
2.7.11.1	↗	↗	↗	↗

Gene location (Human)
Chr.	Chromosome 17 (human)
Band	17p13.1	Start	8,204,733 bp
Band	17p13.1	End	8,210,600 bp

Gene location (Mouse)
Chr.	Chromosome 11 (mouse)
Band	11 B3|11 42.32 cM	Start	68,936,473 bp
Band	11 B3|11 42.32 cM	End	68,942,490 bp
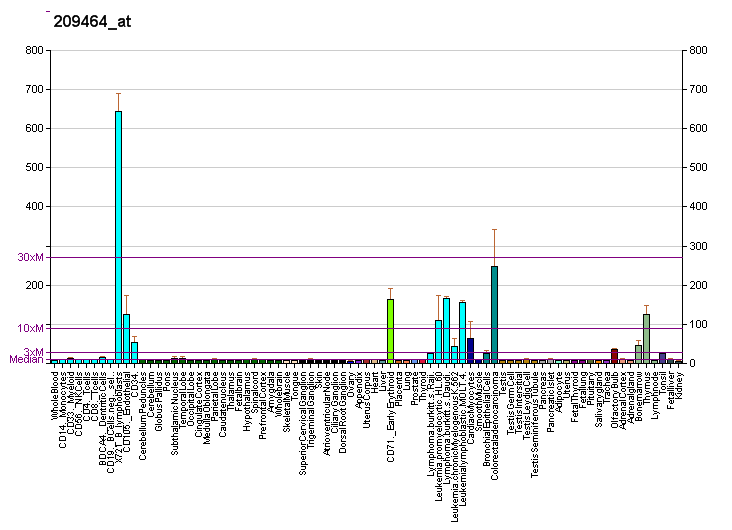
RNA expression pattern
Bgee	Human / Mouse (ortholog); Top expressed in: ventricular zone; ganglionic eminence; oocyte; gonad; mucosa of transverse colon; tibial nerve; stromal cell of endometrium; sural nerve; rectum; bone marrow / Top expressed in: tail of embryo; genital tubercle; yolk sac; otic placode; otic vesicle; ventricular zone; abdominal wall; somite; epiblast; fetal liver hematopoietic progenitor cell; More reference expression data
BioGPS	More reference expression data
Gene ontology
Molecular function	transferase activity; nucleotide binding; protein kinase activity; histone serine kinase activity; metal ion binding; kinase activity; protein binding; protein serine/threonine/tyrosine kinase activity; ATP binding; protein serine/threonine kinase activity; kinase binding
Cellular component	cytoplasm; cytosol; spindle; spindle pole centrosome; nucleoplasm; chromosome; chromosome passenger complex; midbody; spindle microtubule; spindle midzone; chromocenter; chromosome, centromeric region; cytoskeleton; nucleus; kinetochore; condensed chromosome, centromeric region; mitotic spindle midzone
Biological process	abscission; cleavage furrow formation; positive regulation of telomere capping; phosphorylation; mitotic spindle midzone assembly; histone modification; cellular response to UV; ageing; positive regulation of telomere maintenance via telomerase; negative regulation of transcription by RNA polymerase II; negative regulation of protein binding; positive regulation of cytokinesis; regulation of chromosome segregation; cell division; protein phosphorylation; spindle checkpoint signaling; positive regulation of telomerase activity; protein autophosphorylation; negative regulation of B cell apoptotic process; negative regulation of cytokinesis; anaphase-promoting complex-dependent catabolic process; cell cycle; cell population proliferation; attachment of spindle microtubules to kinetochore; protein localization to kinetochore; spindle organization; regulation of signal transduction by p53 class mediator; mitotic cell cycle; mitotic cytokinesis checkpoint signaling; mitotic spindle organization; mitotic spindle assembly checkpoint signaling; regulation of cytokinesis; ubiquitin-dependent protein catabolic process
Sources:Amigo / QuickGO
Orthologs
Databases	NCBI: entry; OMA: entry
Species	Human	Mouse
Entrez	9212	20877
Ensembl	ENSG00000178999	ENSMUSG00000020897
UniProt	Q96GD4	O70126
RefSeq (mRNA)	NM_001313950; NM_001313951; NM_001313952; NM_001313953; NM_001313954 NM_001313955; NM_001256834; NM_001284526; NM_004217	NM_011496
RefSeq (protein)	NP_001243763; NP_001271455; NP_001300879; NP_001300880; NP_001300881 NP_001300882; NP_001300883; NP_001300884; NP_004208	NP_035626
Location (UCSC)	Chr 17: 8.2 – 8.21 Mb	Chr 11: 68.94 – 68.94 Mb
PubMed search
- Wikidata
View/Edit Human	View/Edit Mouse

Aurora kinase B is a protein that functions in the attachment of the mitotic spindle to the centromere and in cytokinesis.

== Discovery ==
In 1998, Aurora kinase B was identified in humans by a polymerase chain reaction screen for kinases that are overexpressed in cancers. In the same year, rat Aurora kinase B was identified in a screen designed to find kinases that altered S. cerevisiae proliferation when overexpressed.

== Expression and subcellular localization ==
Aurora kinase B (in green) localizes in a cell cycle dependent manner. (DNA is in blue)

The expression and activity of Aurora B are regulated according to the cell cycle. Expression of Aurora B reaches a maximum at the G2-M transition, whereas Aurora B protein is most active during mitosis.

Aurora B is a chromosomal passenger protein. Specifically, Aurora B localizes to the chromosomes in prophase, the centromere in prometaphase and metaphase, and the central mitotic spindle in anaphase. This localization has been determined by indirect immunofluorescence in mammalian, C. elegans, and Drosophila cells. A more detailed analysis of Aurora B localization has been carried out in mammalian cells by tagging Aurora B with green fluorescent protein. This analysis showed that the association of Aurora B with centromeres is dynamic (Aurora B at the centromere is constantly exchanging with a pool of cytoplasmic Aurora B). The analysis of tagged Aurora B also suggested that it associates with spindle microtubules during anaphase of mitosis and this association significantly limits its mobility. Finally, a portion of the tagged Aurora B localized to the equatorial cell cortex, having been transported to this location by astral microtubules.

== Function ==
Chromosomal segregation during mitosis as well as meiosis is regulated by kinases and phosphatases. The Aurora kinases associate with microtubules during chromosome movement and segregation. Aurora kinase B localizes to microtubules near kinetochores, specifically to the specialized microtubules called K-fibers, and Aurora kinase A (MIM 603072) localizes to centrosomes (Lampson et al., 2004).[supplied by OMIM]

In cancerous cells, over-expression of these enzymes causes unequal distribution of genetic information, creating aneuploid cells, a hallmark of cancer.

=== Chromosome biorientation ===
Studies in several organisms indicate that Aurora B oversees chromosome biorientation by ensuring that appropriate connections are made between spindle microtubules and kinetochores.

Inhibition of Aurora B function by RNA interference or microinjection of blocking antibodies impairs the alignment of chromosomes at the equator of the mitotic spindle. This process of alignment is referred to as chromosome congression. The reason for this defect is a subject of ongoing study. Aurora B inhibition may lead to an increase in the number of syntelic attachments (sister chromatid pairs in which both sister kinetochores are attached to microtubules radiating from the same spindle pole). Intriguingly, expression of a dominant-negative and catalytically inactive form of Aurora B disrupted microtubule attachment to the kinetochore and prevented the association of dynein and centromere protein E (CENP-E) with kinetochores.

Numerous kinetochore targets of Aurora kinases have been determined in organisms ranging from yeast to man. Most notably, CENP-A is a target of Aurora B. The phosphorylation of CENP-A by Aurora B reaches a maximum in prometaphase. In fact, Aurora A targets the same CENP-A phosphorylation site as Aurora B, and CENP-A phosphorylation by Aurora A is thought to precede that by Aurora B. Thus, a model has been proposed in which CENP-A phosphorylation by Aurora A recruits Aurora B to the centromere, the latter maintaining the phosphorylation state of CENP-A in a positive feedback loop. Mutation of this phosphorylation site in CENP-A also leads to defects in cytokinesis.

Aurora B also interacts with mitotic centromere-associated kinesin (MCAK). Both Aurora B and MCAK localize to the inner centromere during prometaphase. Aurora B has been shown to recruit MCAK to the centromere and directly phosphorylate MCAK on various residues. Phosphorylation of MCAK by Aurora B limits the ability of MCAK to depolymerize microtubules. Importantly, inhibition of MCAK by a number of approaches leads to improper attachment of kinetochores to spindle microtubules.

It has been hypothesized that tension generated by amphitelic attachment (biorientation; the attachment of sister kinetochores to opposite spindle poles) pulls sister kinetochores apart, thus disrupting the interaction of Aurora B at the innermost portion of the centromere with microtubule binding sites on the fibrous corona of the outermost centromere. Specifically, the tension generated by biorientation pulls MCAK outside of the area of Aurora B localization. Thus, mitosis proceeds upon biorientation and dissociation of Aurora B from its substrates.

=== Chromosome condensation and cohesion ===
Aurora B is responsible for phosphorylation of histone-H3 on serine 10 during mitosis. This modification is conserved from yeast (where the kinase is known as Ipl1) to human. Notably, histone-H3 phosphorylation by Aurora B seems not to be responsible for chromatin condensation. Though Aurora B is enriched at centromeres, it localizes diffusely to all chromatin.

In Drosophila cells, Aurora B depletion disrupts chromosome structure and compaction. In these cells, the condensin complex does not localize appropriately to the chromosomes. Similarly, in C. elegans, condensin activity is dependent on Aurora B in metaphase. However, in Xenopus egg cell-free extracts, condensin binding and chromosome condensation occur normally even in the absence of Aurora B. Likewise, after treating cells with an Aurora B enzyme inhibitor (Aurora B localization is not affected), the condensin complex localizes normally.

Aurora B localizes to the paired arms of homologous chromosomes in metaphase I of C. elegans meiosis, and perturbs microtubule dynamics in mitosis. Release of this cohesion, which is dependent on Aurora B, is required for progression to anaphase I and segregation of homologous chromosomes. In mitotic vertebrate B lymphocytes, the proper centromeric localization of a number of Aurora B binding partners requires cohesin.

=== Cytokinesis ===
The Aurora B complex is necessary for cytokinesis in vertebrates, C. elegans, Drosophila, and fission yeast.

In various cell types, overexpression of a catalytically inactive Aurora B prevents cytokinesis. Disruption of cytokinesis can also arise from Aurora B mislocalization due to mutation of Aurora B binding partners.

Aurora B targets a number of proteins that localize to the cleavage furrow, including the type-III intermediate filament proteins vimentin, desmin, and glial fibrillary acidic protein (GFAP). In general, phosphorylation destabilizes intermediate filaments. Therefore, it has been proposed that phosphorylation of intermediate filaments at the cleavage furrow destabilizes the filaments in preparation for cytokinesis. In agreement with this hypothesis, mutation of Aurora B target sites in intermediate filament proteins leads to defects in filament deformation and prevents the final stage of cytokinesis.

Aurora B also phosphorylates myosin II regulatory light chain at the cleavage furrow. Inhibition of Aurora B activity prevents proper myosin II localization to the cleavage furrow and disrupts spindle midzone organization.

=== Spindle assembly checkpoint ===
The spindle assembly checkpoint inhibits progression of mitosis from metaphase to anaphase until all sister chromatid pairs are bioriented.

Presence of Aurora B halts metaphase-to-anaphase transition until proper biorientation is achieved. This is demonstrated in Aurora B deficient cells, where inhibition of Aurora B by hesperadin causes the cell to progress from metaphase to anaphase even when there are misaligned chromosomes in the cell.

Aurora B may be involved in the localization of MAD2 and BubR1, proteins that recognize correct chromosome attachment to spindle microtubules. Loss of Aurora B lowers the concentration of Mad2 and BubR1 at the kinetochores. In particular, Aurora B seems to be responsible for maintaining the localization of Mad2 and BubR1 to the kinetochore following their initial recruitment, which occurs independent of Aurora B. Aurora B may be directly or indirectly involved in the hyper-phosphorylation of BubR1 seen in mitosis in wild-type cells.

=== Axonal outgrowth and axon regeneration ===
A novel function for Aurora B kinase has recently been reported in neurons. Following axotomy of cultured neurons, significant upregulation in Aurora B kinase gene expression was observed coinciding with regenerative axonal sprouting. Furthermore, overexpression of Aurora B kinase results in accelerated axonal outgrowth of spinal motor neurons in developing zebrafish.

== Regulation ==
Aurora B complexes with three other proteins, Survivin, Borealin and INCENP. Each of the four components of the complex is required for the proper localization and function of the other three. INCENP stimulates Aurora B kinase activity. Survivin might do the same.

Localization of Aurora B to the centromere during prometaphase and metaphase requires phosphorylation of the mammalian kinetochore-specific histone-H3 variant centromere protein A (CENP-A). CENP-A associates with the centromere and is necessary for assembly of the kinetochore. Phosphorylation of CENP-A at serine 7 by Aurora A kinase recruits Aurora B to the centromere. Aurora B, itself, can also phosphorylate CENP-A at the same residue once it is recruited (see below).

Additionally, topoisomerase II has been implicated in the regulation of Aurora B localization and enzymatic activity. This regulatory role may be directly associated with the role of topoisomerase II in disjoining sister chromatids prior to anaphase. In topoisomerase II-depleted cells, Aurora B and INCENP do not transfer to the central spindle in late mitosis. Instead, they remain tightly associated with the centromeres of non-disjoined sister chromatids. Also, cells deficient in topoisomerase II show significantly reduced Aurora B kinase activity. Inhibition of Aurora B due to loss of topoisomerase II seems to depend on BubR1 activity (see below).

Aurora B has been shown to bind to end-binding protein 1 (EB1), a protein that regulates microtubule dynamics. Indirect immunofluorescence showed that Aurora B and EB1 colocalize during anaphase on the central spindle and in the midbody during cytokinesis. Intriguingly, EB1 overexpression enhances Aurora B kinase activity, at least in part because EB1 blocks the dephosphorylation/inactivation of Aurora B by protein phosphatase 2A.

== Interactions ==
Aurora B kinase has been shown to interact with:

- BARD1
- BIRC5,
- CDCA8
- TACC1.
- FBXL2.

== Clinical significance ==
=== Cancer ===
Abnormally elevated levels of Aurora B kinase cause unequal chromosomal separation during cell division, resulting in the formation of cells with abnormal numbers of chromosomes, which are both a cause and driver of cancer.

Inhibition of Aurora B kinase by BI811283 in cancer cells leads to the formation of cells with severely abnormal numbers of chromosomes (polyploid). Counterintuitively, inhibition of Aurora B kinase actually causes the polyploid cells formed to continue dividing however, because these cells have severe chromosomal abnormalities, they eventually stop dividing or undergo cell death.

== See also ==
- Aurora kinase
  - Aurora A kinase
  - Aurora C kinase
- INCENP
- Spindle assembly checkpoint
