= CDCA8 =

Protein-coding gene in humans

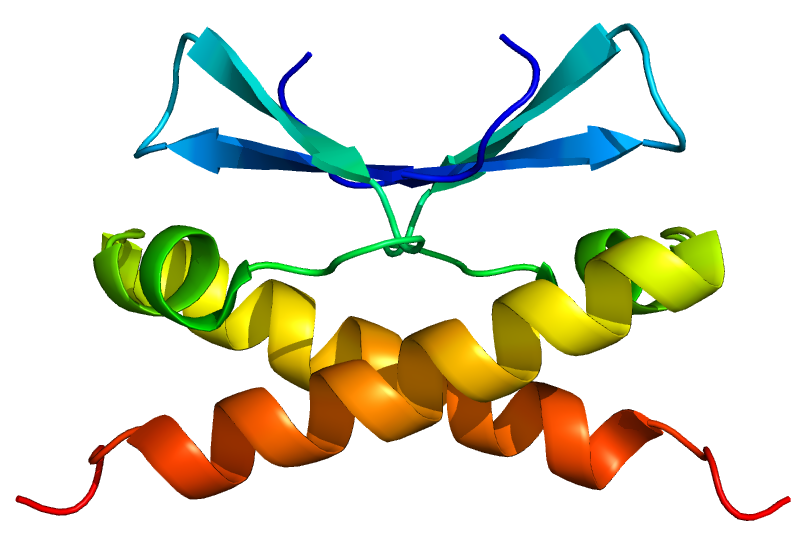

Identifiers
- Aliases: CDCA8, BOR, BOREALIN, DasraB, MESRGP, cell division cycle associated 8
- External IDs: OMIM: 609977; MGI: 1196274; GeneCards: CDCA8
Available structures
PDB	Ortholog search: PDBe RCSB
PDB	List of PDB id codes 2KDD, 2QFA, 2RAW, 2RAX

Gene location (Human)
Chr.	Chromosome 1 (human)
Band	1p34.3	Start	37,692,481 bp
Band	1p34.3	End	37,709,719 bp

Gene location (Mouse)
Chr.	Chromosome 4 (mouse)
Band	4 D2.2|4 57.93 cM	Start	124,812,258 bp
Band	4 D2.2|4 57.93 cM	End	124,833,104 bp
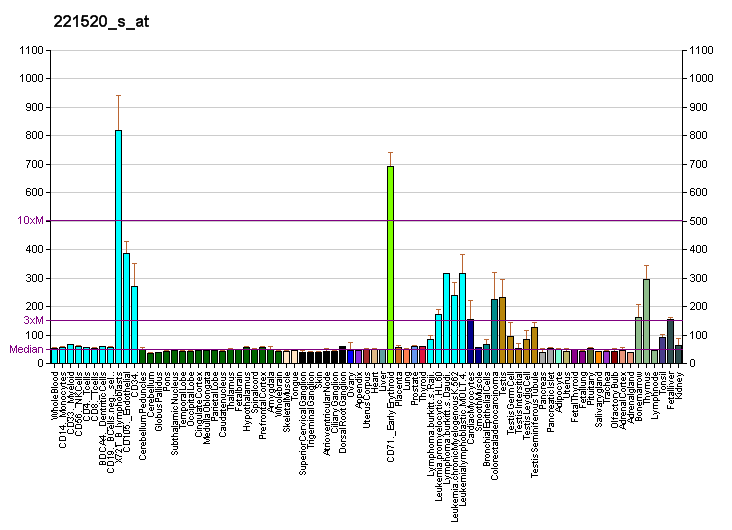
RNA expression pattern
Bgee	Human / Mouse (ortholog); Top expressed in: oocyte; secondary oocyte; ventricular zone; gonad; embryo; ganglionic eminence; right testis; left testis; mucosa of transverse colon; testicle / Top expressed in: Paneth cell; renal corpuscle; condyle; primitive streak; fossa; primary oocyte; ureter; medullary collecting duct; zygote; endocardial cushion; More reference expression data
BioGPS	More reference expression data
Gene ontology
Molecular function	protein binding
Cellular component	intercellular bridge; nucleolus; nucleoplasm; cytoplasm; spindle; chromosome; cytosol; nucleus; chromosome, centromeric region; chromocenter; midbody; chromosome passenger complex; spindle midzone; cytoskeleton; protein-containing complex
Biological process	chromosome organization; cell cycle; cell division; mitotic metaphase plate congression; mitotic sister chromatid segregation
Sources:Amigo / QuickGO
Orthologs
Databases	NCBI: entry; OMA: entry
Species	Human	Mouse
Entrez	55143	52276
Ensembl	ENSG00000134690	ENSMUSG00000028873
UniProt	Q53HL2	Q8BHX3
RefSeq (mRNA)	NM_018101; NM_001256875	NM_026560
RefSeq (protein)	NP_001243804; NP_060571	NP_080836
Location (UCSC)	Chr 1: 37.69 – 37.71 Mb	Chr 4: 124.81 – 124.83 Mb
PubMed search
- Wikidata
View/Edit Human	View/Edit Mouse

Borealin is a protein that in humans is encoded by the CDCA8 gene.

== Function ==
CDCA8 is a component of a chromosomal passenger complex required for stability of the bipolar mitotic spindle.

== Interactions ==
CDCA8 has been shown to interact with INCENP, Survivin and Aurora B kinase.
