= KIF2C =

Protein-coding gene in humans

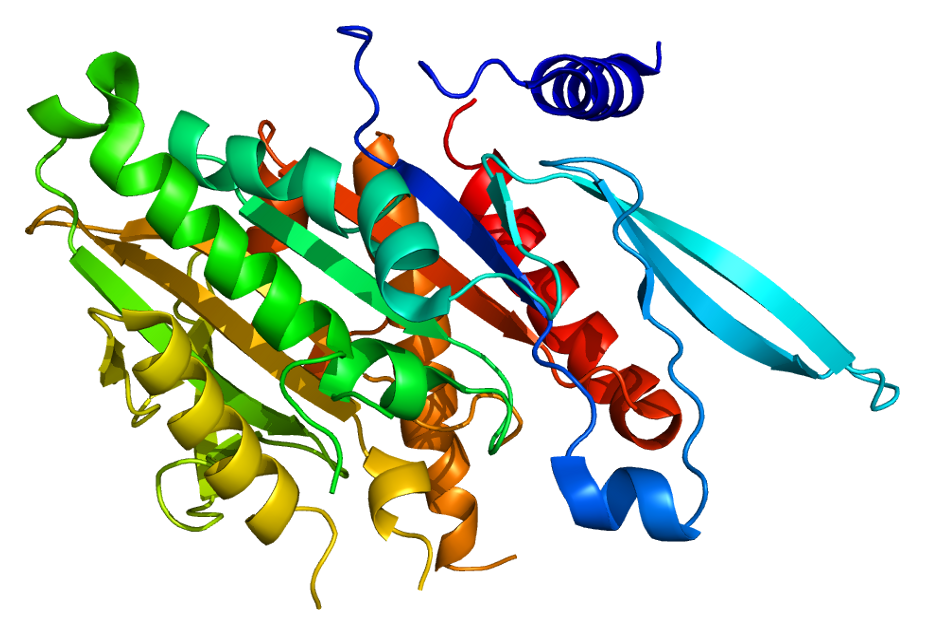

Identifiers
- Aliases: KIF2C, CT139, KNSL6, MCAK, kinesin family member 2C
- External IDs: OMIM: 604538; MGI: 1921054; GeneCards: KIF2C
Available structures
PDB	Ortholog search: PDBe RCSB
PDB	List of PDB id codes 2HEH, 4UBF, 4Y05

Gene location (Human)
Chr.	Chromosome 1 (human)
Band	1p34.1	Start	44,739,818 bp
Band	1p34.1	End	44,767,767 bp

Gene location (Mouse)
Chr.	Chromosome 4 (mouse)
Band	4 D1|4 53.42 cM	Start	117,016,836 bp
Band	4 D1|4 53.42 cM	End	117,039,836 bp
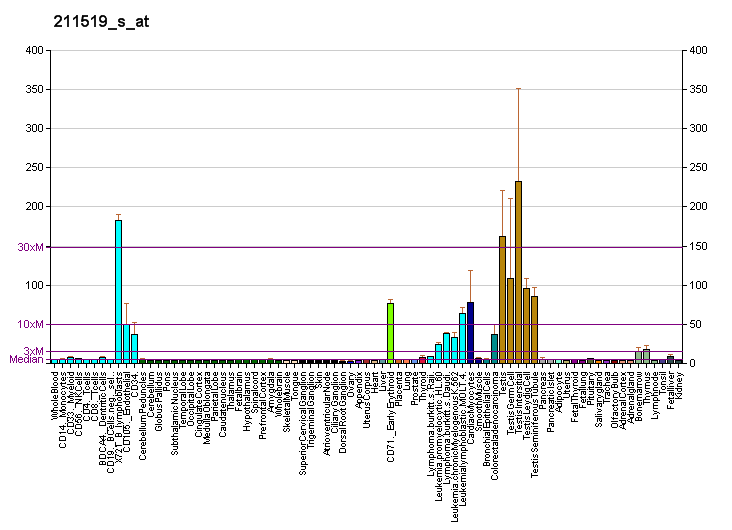

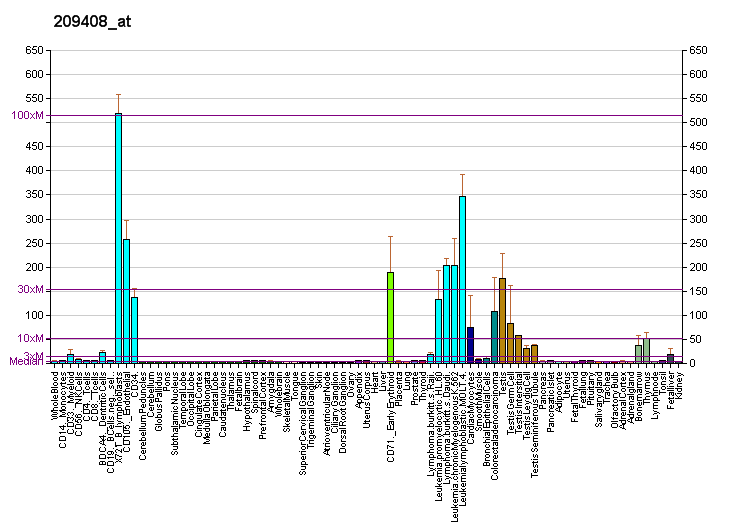
RNA expression pattern
Bgee	Human / Mouse (ortholog); Top expressed in: secondary oocyte; ventricular zone; right testis; left testis; sperm; embryo; ganglionic eminence; gonad; testicle; bone marrow / Top expressed in: otic placode; seminiferous tubule; otic vesicle; primary oocyte; saccule; primitive streak; maxillary prominence; spermatid; endothelial cell of lymphatic vessel; mandibular prominence; More reference expression data
BioGPS	More reference expression data
Gene ontology
Molecular function	nucleotide binding; microtubule binding; microtubule plus-end binding; centromeric DNA binding; ATPase activity; protein binding; ATP binding; microtubule motor activity
Cellular component	cytoplasm; membrane; kinesin complex; microtubule cytoskeleton; chromosome; microtubule plus-end; cytoplasmic microtubule; chromosome, centromeric region; cytoskeleton; microtubule; nucleus; kinetochore; nucleoplasm; centrosome; cytosol
Biological process	antigen processing and presentation of exogenous peptide antigen via MHC class II; establishment or maintenance of microtubule cytoskeleton polarity; chromosome segregation; cell division; regulation of chromosome segregation; microtubule-based movement; cell cycle; microtubule depolymerization; mitotic metaphase plate congression; cell population proliferation; retrograde vesicle-mediated transport, Golgi to endoplasmic reticulum; sister chromatid cohesion; metaphase plate congression; attachment of mitotic spindle microtubules to kinetochore; mitotic cell cycle
Sources:Amigo / QuickGO
Orthologs
Databases	NCBI: entry; OMA: entry
Species	Human	Mouse
Entrez	11004	73804
Ensembl	ENSG00000142945	ENSMUSG00000028678
UniProt	Q99661	Q922S8
RefSeq (mRNA)	NM_001297655; NM_001297656; NM_001297657; NM_006845	NM_001290662; NM_134471
RefSeq (protein)	NP_001284584; NP_001284585; NP_001284586; NP_006836	NP_001277591; NP_608301
Location (UCSC)	Chr 1: 44.74 – 44.77 Mb	Chr 4: 117.02 – 117.04 Mb
PubMed search
- Wikidata
View/Edit Human	View/Edit Mouse

Kinesin-like protein KIF2C is a protein that in humans is encoded by the KIF2C gene.

The protein encoded by this gene is a member of kinesin-like protein family, and contains common ATPase site structures such as the P-loop, Switch 1, and Switch 2. Most proteins of this family are microtubule-dependent molecular motors that transport organelles within cells and move chromosomes during cell division. This protein acts to regulate microtubule dynamics in cells and is important for anaphase chromosome segregation and may be required to coordinate the onset of sister centromere separation.

A ribbon and surface diagram of the KIF2C motor domain. The kinesin structure is pseudo-colored to highlight the ATPase site with a bound nucleotide. The figure then presents KIF2C binding to the tubulin dimer and finally visualizes a KIF2C motor head in the context of the microtubule filament.
