= Survivin =

Mammalian protein

BIRC5
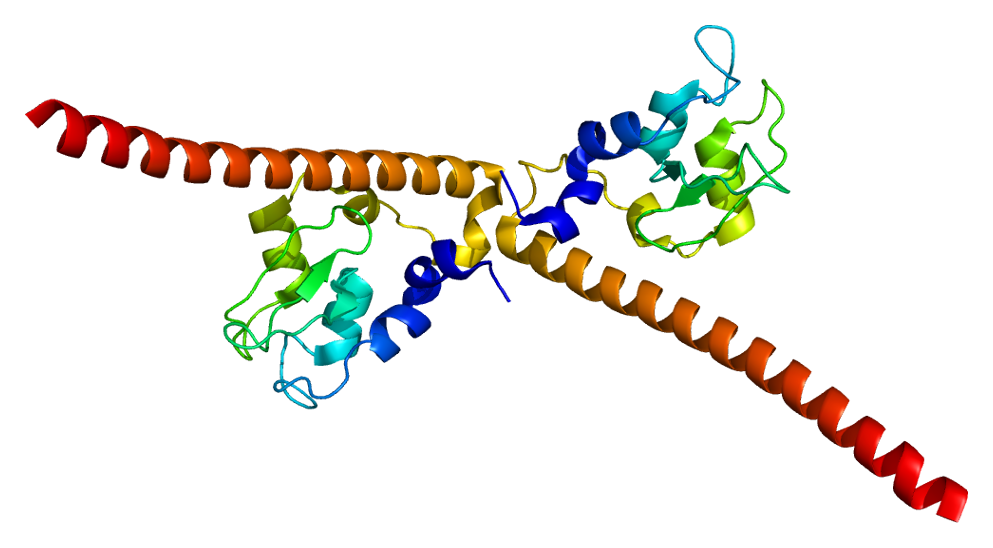

Identifiers
- Aliases: BIRC5, API4, EPR-1, baculoviral IAP repeat containing 5
- External IDs: OMIM: 603352; MGI: 1203517; GeneCards: BIRC5
Available structures
| PDB | Ortholog search: PDBe RCSB |
| PDB | List of PDB id codes 1E31, 1F3H, 1XOX, 2QFA, 2RAW, 2RAX, 3UEC, 3UED, 3UEE, 3UEF, 3UEG, 3UEH, 3UEI, 3UIG, 3UIH, 3UII, 3UIJ, 3UIK, 4A0I, 4A0J, 4A0N |

Gene location (Human)
| Chr. | Chromosome 17 (human) |
| Band | 17q25.3 | Start | 78,214,186 bp |
| Band | 17q25.3 | End | 78,225,636 bp |

Gene location (Mouse)
| Chr. | Chromosome 11 (mouse) |
| Band | 11|11 E2 | Start | 117,740,077 bp |
| Band | 11|11 E2 | End | 117,746,569 bp |
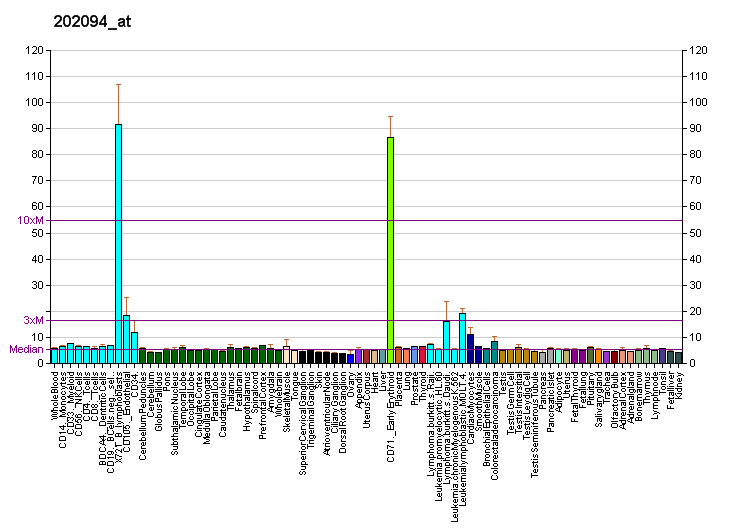

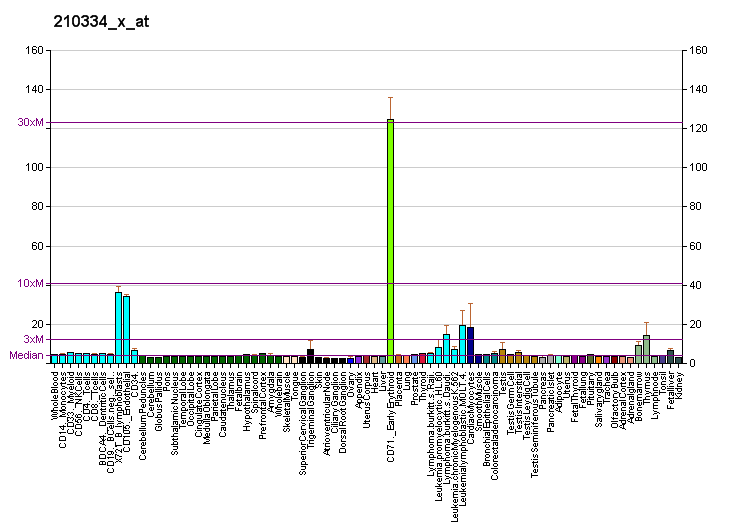

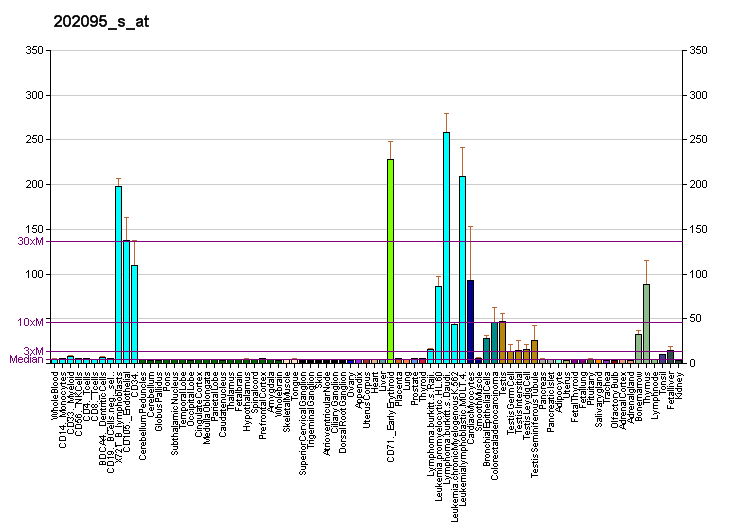
RNA expression pattern
| Bgee | Human / Mouse (ortholog); Top expressed in: ventricular zone; ganglionic eminence; gonad; left testis; right testis; mucosa of transverse colon; bone marrow; trabecular bone; stromal cell of endometrium; testicle / Top expressed in: fetal liver hematopoietic progenitor cell; primary oocyte; otic placode; endocardial cushion; zygote; maxillary prominence; mandibular prominence; dermis; abdominal wall; blastocyst; More reference expression data |
| BioGPS | More reference expression data |
Gene ontology
| Molecular function | peptidase inhibitor activity; cobalt ion binding; chaperone binding; protein homodimerization activity; metal ion binding; ubiquitin-protein transferase activity; tubulin binding; cysteine-type endopeptidase inhibitor activity involved in apoptotic process; protein binding; identical protein binding; protein heterodimerization activity; enzyme binding; microtubule binding; zinc ion binding; cysteine-type endopeptidase inhibitor activity |
| Cellular component | cytosol; spindle; chromosome; nucleoplasm; chromosome passenger complex; nuclear chromosome; interphase microtubule organizing center; spindle microtubule; centriole; cytoplasmic microtubule; cytoskeleton; microtubule; kinetochore; midbody; cytoplasm; chromosome, centromeric region; nucleus |
| Biological process | negative regulation of peptidase activity; negative regulation of cysteine-type endopeptidase activity involved in apoptotic process; regulation of transcription, DNA-templated; inhibition of cysteine-type endopeptidase activity involved in apoptotic process; establishment of chromosome localization; chromosome segregation; positive regulation of mitotic cell cycle; positive regulation of exit from mitosis; transcription, DNA-templated; cell division; protein phosphorylation; mitotic spindle assembly; regulation of signal transduction; G2/M transition of mitotic cell cycle; positive regulation of cell population proliferation; protein-containing complex localization; cell cycle; negative regulation of transcription, DNA-templated; apoptotic process; regulation of apoptotic process; negative regulation of apoptotic process; regulation of mitotic cell cycle; mitotic cell cycle; hearing; mitotic cytokinesis; mitotic spindle assembly checkpoint signaling; cytokine-mediated signaling pathway; protein ubiquitination; negative regulation of endopeptidase activity |
Sources:Amigo / QuickGO
Orthologs
| Databases | NCBI: entry; OMA: entry |
| Species | Human | Mouse |
| Entrez | 332 | 11799 |
| Ensembl | ENSG00000089685 | ENSMUSG00000017716 |
| UniProt | O15392 | O70201 |
| RefSeq (mRNA) | NM_001012270; NM_001012271; NM_001168 | NM_001012272; NM_001012273; NM_009689 |
| RefSeq (protein) | NP_001012270; NP_001012271; NP_001159 | NP_001012273; NP_033819 |
| Location (UCSC) | Chr 17: 78.21 – 78.23 Mb | Chr 11: 117.74 – 117.75 Mb |
| PubMed search |
- Wikidata
| View/Edit Human | View/Edit Mouse |

Survivin, also called baculoviral inhibitor of apoptosis repeat-containing 5 or BIRC5, is a protein that, in humans, is encoded by the BIRC5 gene.

Survivin is a member of the inhibitor of apoptosis (IAP) family. The survivin protein functions to inhibit caspase activation, thereby leading to negative regulation of apoptosis or programmed cell death. This has been shown by disruption of survivin induction pathways leading to increase in apoptosis and decrease in tumour growth. The survivin protein is expressed highly in most human tumours and fetal tissue, but is completely absent in terminally differentiated cells.

== Structure ==
Survivin is distinguished from other IAP family members in that it has only one baculoviral IAP repeat (BIR) domain. The protein is 16.5 kDa large and is the smallest member of the IAP family.

== Function ==
Survivin is expressed in a cell cycle-dependent manner, with highest levels in the G2/M phase. It localizes to the mitotic spindle during cell division and interacts with tubulin. Survivin plays important roles in regulating mitosis, inhibiting apoptosis, and promoting angiogenesis.

== Role in cancer ==
Survivin is highly expressed in most human cancers but is rarely detectable in normal adult tissues. Its overexpression in tumors correlates with increased drug resistance, reduced apoptosis, and poor patient prognosis. The aberrant regulation of survivin in cancer cells makes it an attractive target for cancer therapy.

Several approaches targeting survivin are being investigated as potential cancer treatments, including:

- Antisense oligonucleotides to inhibit survivin expression
- Small molecule inhibitors of survivin function
- Immunotherapy approaches using survivin as a tumor-associated antigen
- Combination therapies to sensitize cancer cells to apoptosis by inhibiting survivin

== Interactions ==
Survivin has been shown to interact with:

- Aurora B kinase
- CDCA8
- Caspase 3
- Caspase 7
- DIABLO
- INCENP
