= Bateson–Dobzhansky–Muller model =

Model of the evolution of genetic incompatibility

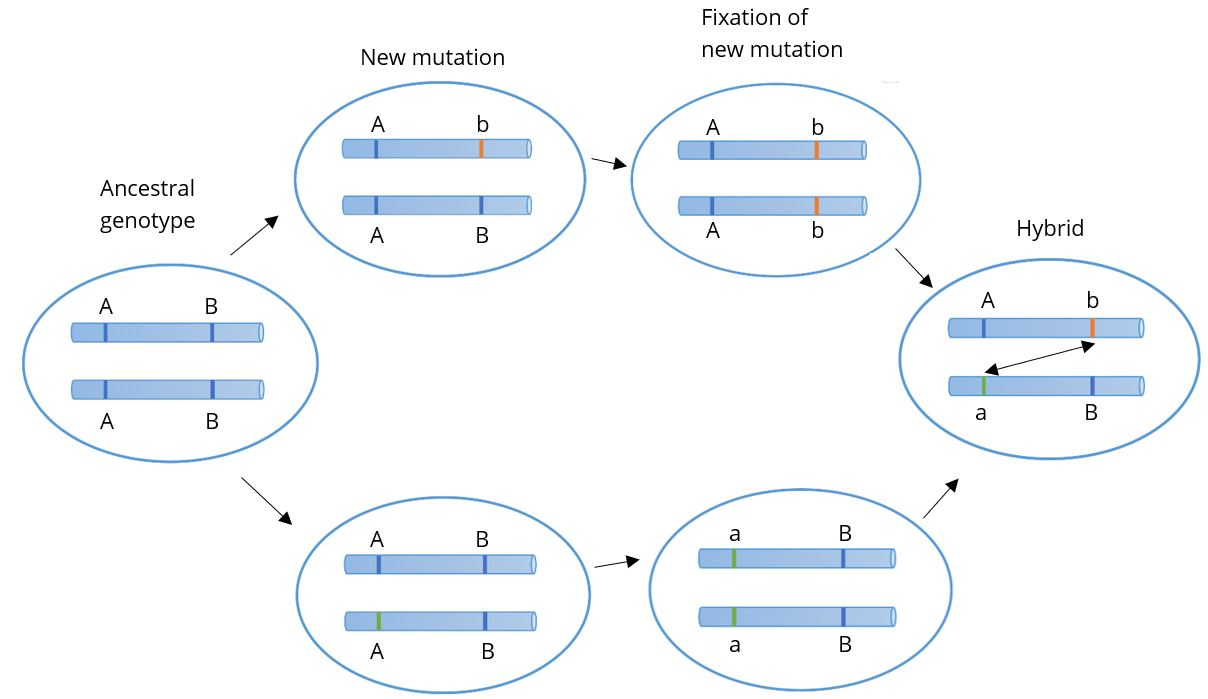
Figure 1. In the ancestral population the genotype is AABB. When two populations become isolated from each other, new mutations can arise. In one population A evolves into a, and in the other B evolves into b. When the two populations hybridise it is the first time a and b interact with each other. When these alleles are incompatible, we speak of Dobzhansky–Muller incompatibilities.

The Bateson–Dobzhansky–Muller model, also known as Dobzhansky–Muller model, is a model of the evolution of genetic incompatibility, important in understanding the evolution of reproductive isolation during speciation and the role of natural selection in bringing it about. The theory was first described by William Bateson in 1909, then independently described by Theodosius Dobzhansky in 1934, and later elaborated in different forms by Herman Muller, H. Allen Orr and Sergey Gavrilets.

The Dobzhansky–Muller model describes the negative epistatic interactions that occur between different alleles (versions) of different genes with a different evolutionary history. These genetic incompatibilities can occur when populations are hybridising. When two populations diverge from a common ancestor and become isolated from each other, thus meaning there is no interbreeding between the two, mutations can accumulate in both populations. These changes represent evolutionary change in the populations. When the populations are reintroduced to each other, these diverged genes can interact with each other in the hybridising species.

For example, an ancestral species has the alleles a and b fixed in its population, resulting in all individuals having the aabb genotype. When two descendant populations are separated from each other and each undergo several mutations the allele A can occur in one population while the allele B occurs in the second population. When the two populations start hybridising the genotypes AAbb and aaBB hybridise with each other resulting in AaBb (figure 1). Interactions between A and B are introduced which have never occurred before. These two alleles can turn out to be incompatible, which are the Dobzhansky–Muller incompatibilities. The model states that genetic incompatibility is most likely evolved by alternative fixation of two or more loci instead of just one, so that when hybridisation occurs, it is the first time for some of the alleles to co-occur in the same individual.

The Dobzhansky–Muller incompatibilities can result from purely random, neutral or non-selected differences between the populations. They can also be driven by natural selection in at least two ways. When two populations diverge from each other and encounter new - and different - environments they may adapt to these environments. These adaptations can result in hybrid sterility as a side effect. The genes that have arisen to adapt to different ecological surroundings can thus cause hybrid incompatibilities. A second way is when the two diverging populations adapt to a same or similar environment but they do that in a genetically different way. This can result in the populations having different genotypes, that can cause Dobzhansky–Muller incompatibilities.

Genes that are incompatible according to the Dobzhansky–Muller model require three criteria. 1. The gene reduces the fitness of the hybrid, 2. The gene has functionally diverged in each of the hybridising species and, 3. The hybrid incompatibility is only present in combination with a partner gene. Whether the genes are actually incompatible is also dependent on whether the genes are dominant or recessive. Incompatibility will only occur if both alleles are expressed and not if one is recessive.

The genetic changes that are accumulated when populations diverge from a common ancestor will not severely decrease viability or fertility because natural selection influences these strongly deleterious alleles. However, natural selection cannot act when alleles have never occurred together, as they would in the genome of a hybrid. Therefore, it is possible that when these alleles interact, these alleles prove to be incompatible. An incompatible gene prevents the populations from successfully hybridising. These Dobzhansky–Muller incompatibilities can therefore also increase the chance of speciation.

Certain patterns in the Dobzhansky–Muller incompatibilities can provide information of modes of divergence. For instance, if divergence is due to different selection pressures, thus causing natural selection to act, or to random genetic drift. Therefore, Dobzhansky–Muller incompatibilities can also provide information on the time and type of divergence which can help in phylogenetic studies.
