= Orphon =

Gene located outside the main chromosomal locus

An orphon is a gene located outside the main chromosomal locus, i.e., it may be dispersed to an unconnected genomic location.

Orphons have been found in both protein-coding and non-protein-coding gene families, which suggests that most gene transcription processes do not constitute a restriction on the development of orphons. Extensive polymorphism in this feature between individuals of the same species was shown. The gene class was first discovered in yeast, sea urchins, and fruitflies, and has since been reported from the genome of many other eukaryote groups including molluscs, amphibians, and mammals including humans.
