= Wilhelm Ludwig =

German biologist and university teacher (1901–1959)

Wilhelm Ludwig (20 October 1901, in Asch, Austria-Hungary (now Aš, Czech Republic) – 23 January 1959, in Leipzig, East Germany) was a German zoologist and geneticist.

His research interests were population genetics, inbreeding, paternity diagnosis, evolution, biometrics, sensory physiology (optimal Horopter), sex ratio in humans and animals and the right-left problem.

== Life and work ==
Wilhelm Ludwig was born as the son of Wolfgang Ludwig (1855–1919) and Josepha Katharina Taumer (1855–1919). He studied zoology, chemistry and mathematics at the universities of Leipzig, Kiel, and Freiburg with professor Johannes Meisenheimer. He earned his doctorate with a thesis about the "Copulation apparatus of stink bugs". By 1930, he was in habilitation at the Berthold Klatt in Halle at Berthold Klatt with works on the "Theory of ciliary movement". At the University of Halle, he worked with the zoologist Wolfgang von Buddenbrock-Hettersdorff. From 1938, onwards he worked in Halle as a professor. At the suggestion of the biologist and geneticist Richard Goldschmidt, his book, "right-left problem in animals and humans," an issue that continued to deal with him arose. The main theme of his research was initially in genetics and selection, particularly in drosophila.

During the Nazi era, from 1934 onward, he was a member of the National Socialist Teachers League and a member of the Nazi party from 1937 on.

During the Second World War in 1942, he was in the Luftwaffe, but was retracted a little later to the Reich Office for Weatherproof offsets and in 1943 to the Agricultural Meteorological Research Centre in Giessen, where he worked until the war ended. After his release from a POW prison in May 1946, he went back to Halle. In the same year, he became a professor at the Zoological Institute in Mainz, headed by Wolfgang von Buddenbrock, whose collaborator had already been to Halle. In 1949 he became the successor of Erich von Holst at the University of Heidelberg, where he built up the Mathematical and theoretical biology department. In 1950, he published the essay arguing that intrusion was the Fifth Evolutionary Factor, in which he introduced the term annidation.

He died in 1959 at a biometrics meeting in Leipzig. His scientific estate is located in the Heidelberg University Library.

Ludwig was CEO and co-founder of the German branch of the International Biometric Society.

In 1949, he was elected to become a member of the Heidelberg Academy of Sciences.

== Works (selection) ==
Ludwig published a large number of essays in German and international journals.

- Darwins Zuchtwahllehre in moderner Fassung. Frankfurt a.M.: Senckenberg Museum 1948. (Schriften und Reden.)
- mit F. P. Fischer, R. Wartmann: "Der optimale Horopter. Mit einer Konsequenz der subjektiven Himmelskrümmung". In: Pflügers Archiv: European Journal of Physiology Bd. 254, 1952, S. 377–392.
- Das Rechts-Links-Problem im Tierreich und beim Menschen: Mit einem Anhang Rechts-Links-Merkmale der Pflanzen. 1932. Reprint. Springer, Berlin 1970. (= Monographien aus dem Gesamtgebiet der Pflanzen und der Tiere Bd. 27). ISBN 978-3-54004963-0
- mit R. Wette: "Über die Klassifizierung der Asymmetrien und Prüfung des Rechts-Links-Verhältnisses". In: Zeitschrift für menschlich Vererbungs- und Konstitutionslehre Bd. 34, 1958, S. 400–416.

== Fonts (selection) ==
- Martin Mülleroth (1987). "Ludwig, Wilhelm". Neue Deutsche Biographie (in German). Vol. 15. Berlin: Duncker & Humblot. pp. 437–438. (full text online).
- Janis Antonovics: Wilhelm Ludwig and His Contributions to Genetics. In: Trends in Ecology and Evolution Bd 5, Nr. 3, 1990. S. 87–90 (pdf, mit Bibliographie).
