= Parallel speciation =

Type of speciation

In biology, parallel speciation is a type of speciation where there is repeated evolution of reproductively isolating traits via the same mechanisms occurring between separate yet closely related species inhabiting different environments. This leads to a circumstance where independently evolved lineages have developed reproductive isolation from their ancestral lineage, but not from other independent lineages that inhabit similar environments. In order for parallel speciation to be confirmed, there is a set of three requirements that has been established that must be met: there must be phylogenetic independence between the separate populations inhabiting similar environments to ensure that the traits responsible for reproductive isolation evolved separately, there must be reproductive isolation not only between the ancestral population and the descendant population, but also between descendant populations that inhabit dissimilar environments, and descendant populations that inhabit similar environments must not be reproductively isolated from one another. To determine if natural selection specifically is the cause of parallel speciation, a fourth requirement has been established that includes identifying and testing an adaptive mechanism, which eliminates the possibility of a genetic factor such as polyploidy being the responsible agent.

== Parallel speciation vs. parallel evolution ==
Parallel evolution is a common phenomenon that occurs when separate yet closely related lineages evolve the same, non-ancestral trait as a result of inhabiting the same environment, and thus, facing the same selection pressures. An example given of parallel evolution is the independent development of small body sizes in two or more descendant populations in a new, similar environment that diverged from the same ancestral population. Parallel speciation differs from this slightly, as it is a form of parallel evolution, but the traits that are independently evolving in these differing lineages are those that are responsible for reproductive isolation. Using the previous example of independently evolved small body sizes, it changes from parallel evolution to parallel speciation when the descendant populations that have both evolved small body sizes due to their similar environments have become reproductively isolated from their ancestral population, but they are not reproductively isolated from one another.

== Problems in detecting parallel speciation ==
The required analysis of several variables, including genetic markers, morphology, and ecology of these independent populations, makes it hard to attribute speciation events specifically to parallel speciation. Failing to address all three of these contributing factors could incorrectly attribute the event to some other form of speciation, when, in fact, parallel speciation was the occurring process. It can also be difficult to assess due to populations of the same species that may have a small amount of gene flow occurring between them despite living in different areas, but do not have physical barriers to overcome. Without these physical barriers, gene flow cannot be considered insignificant, which can further conceal the evidence of parallel speciation taking place.

== Reported cases ==
However, identifying and demonstrating the cases of parallel speciation is not an easy task to perform because of the many challenges especially in-depth analysis have to be performed in multiple aspects like phylogenetics, ecology, phenotypes and specifically the recurrent formation of reproductive isolation between species. According to previous studies, there are four distinct criteria for a convincing example of parallel speciation:

- In similar environments the populations must have distinct phylogeny and the populations must share multiple origins of arise rather than from gene flow caused by secondary contact of allopatric populations.
- The descendant populations must be in reproductive isolation from ancestral populations.
- There must be no reproductive isolation in descendant populations.
- The evolution of shared characteristics in descendant populations must occur through natural selection.

Even though, there are multiple well characterized cases of parallel speciation for example sticklebacks, stick insects finches, marine snails, and cichlid fishes, have been documented but in case of plants only a couple of cases have been reported. Although, the mechanisms and adaptive processes involved in parallel speciation are largely unknown.

== Parallel speciation in plants ==
Parallel speciation is documented in animals multiple times. although, in plants the parallel speciation cases are not much which suggest that plants are not prone towards the parallel speciation, but this also indicates that there are not enough empirical studies available which are based on rigorous evaluation and testing, like in the cases of animals. A well characterized case of parallel speciation in wild rice has been demonstrated in which all the four criteria of parallel speciation have been qualified. In this case cutting edge methods and tools like whole genome sequencing and sanger sequencing of populations samples were used. The verification of meeting the multiple origin of derived species criteria, was performed by phylogenetic analysis and ABC modelling. With this case of wild rice Oryza nivara from Oryza rufipogon and other reported case in plants lays a foundation that the parallel speciation is not common in plant species. The reproduction isolation is most important criteria in parallel speciation, and it was achieved because of the flowering time difference across the wild species in the habitat and the examples of such premating isolation mechanism are reported previously.

Environmental conditions and abiotic stresses are one of the many reasons of parallel speciation in plant species. It is hypothesized that the plant species Oryza nivara is originated from Oryza rufipogon because of the ecological shift from prolonged damp to a seasonally dry habitat during the recent glaciations. The consistency of this hypothesis can be verified through estimated time of origin of Oryza nivara and distribution modelling of species, suggesting that precipitation and temperature were the main climatic drivers of Oryza nivara distribution. Similarly, this hypothesis is supported by the fact that the annual grasses have been evolved (adapted) to the dry climate of monsoonal Asia. Furthermore, the climatic stresses also interfere with the ecology, morphology, and physiology of plants for example the drought can affect the flowering time and pattern in plant species. Flowering time is heavily investigated in plant species and used as a tool to identify the drought escape in plants. Interestingly, early flowering helps plant species to avoid seasonal drought and results in increased fitness in shortened growing seasons. Thus, the flowering is considered a “magic trait” in plant species that help in adaptation and enables the reproductive isolation required for parallel speciation. The almost complete isolation in flowering time combined with the difference in mating system is making it a strong premating barrier to gene flow among the species and played a pivotal role in Oryza nivara origin.

== Parallel speciation and natural selection ==
Natural selection plays a pivotal role in almost all the theories of speciation . Selection is one of the driving forces of genetic diversity among the allopatric populations which gave rise to reproductive isolation as incidental by-product. However, the laboratory-based experiments are supporting this argument, but due to the inadequate evidence in nature it is unclear that how natural selection and environment plays their roles in the origination of reproductive isolation. Testing the role of natural selection in parallel speciation have focusing on the reinforcement of premating isolation. But for the reinforcement, the requirement is preexisting reproductive isolation in the form of decreased hybrid fitness and is normally considered a final stride towards the process of speciation. Interestingly, the instances of repeated, parallel evolution in response to environmental stimuli presents the tiny bits of evidence of evolution by natural selection. The role of natural selection in the parallel speciation of stick insect populations has been reported. Similarly other studies also suggest the similar results in which the role of natural selection have been indicated in the process of parallel speciation.
