= Genetic incompatibility =

Mating which yields defective offspring

Genetic incompatibility describes the process by which mating yields offspring that are nonviable, prone to disease, or genetically defective in some way. In nature, mating strategies have evolved to allow females to choose or otherwise determine mates which are more likely to result in viable offspring.

Polyandry, for instance, when a female mates with two or more males during a period of sexual receptivity, reduces the chance that a singular mate is genetically incompatible. Exactly how females determine compatible genes prior to mating is not completely understood, but various mechanisms have been proposed, such as pheromones and male appearance and/or courtship behavior.

It is also surmised that sexual selection can continue after copulation, the so called 'cryptic female choice', so named because it takes place within the body and cannot be directly observed. In this scenario, incompatible male sperm can be rejected by the female.

Genetic incompatibility can be engineered by scientists in order to control pests such as mosquitos and fruit flies.

== Infertility ==
Introduced to the scientific community in the early 1990s, the concept of cryptic female choice is complicated and offers a new explanation for infertility. Non-additive genetic effects have been thought of to be the main reason for reproductive isolation between species. More recent studies have concluded that in comparison to additive genetic effects, non-additive genetic effects have a more important role in fertility and embryo survival. As a result, some scientists have concluded that rather than the genes of the female alone or the genes of the male alone being the reason for the pair to be infertile, it is a result of the relationship and compatibility of their genes. Thus, some male genotypes may have a higher success rate of fertilization with some female genotypes rather than others.

Certain alleles being paired together can lead to complete reproductive failure/incompatibility as a result of differential compatibility between different variants. Another contributing factor to incompatibility is based on the surface carbohydrates of the gametes. Multiple studies have shown that the physical contact between the sperm and the egg can cause a chemical reaction in the female. This reaction occurs when the egg comes in contact with non-compatible surface glycans and can impact the sperm's potential for fertilization by causing structural changes in the sperm's surface glycans.

=== Fruit flies ===
There are numerous other factors that can likewise contribute to the incompatibility of male and female haplotypes within an embryo. For example, certain male Drosophila melanogaster (Fruit Flies) carry a drive allele that on average results in them producing 50% less viable sperm than their counterparts who are not heterozygous for the allele. Not only are offspring of heterozygous males less genetically competitive, if both the male and female are heterozygous, their offspring will be either inviable or infertile

=== Rosy bitterlings ===
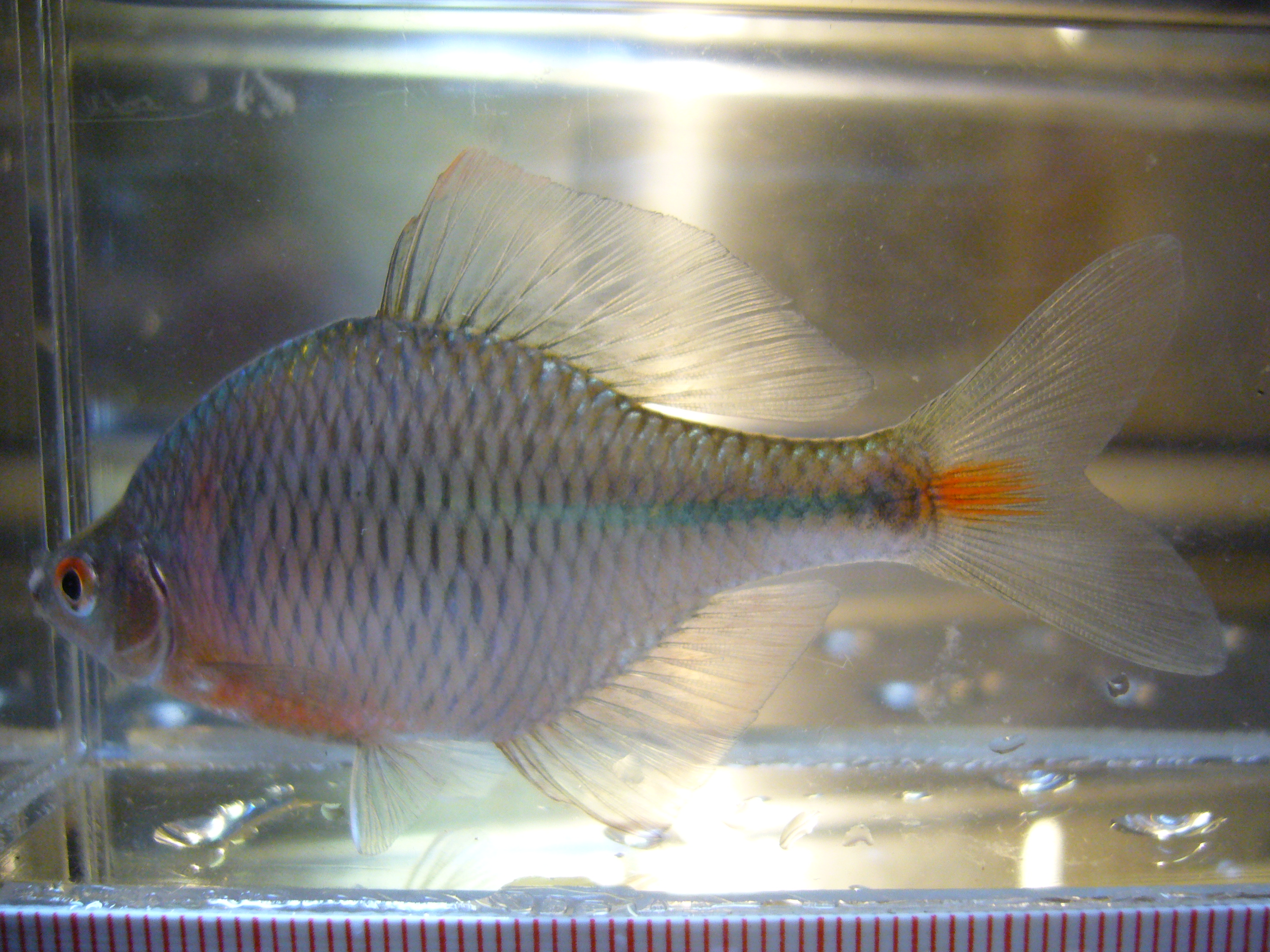
Rhodeus ocellatus

One example of how indirect non additive genes impact fertility comes from a team of researchers who investigated how female rhodeus ocellatus (rosy bitterlings) employ mate choice and the role of the MHC gene in that decision. After allowing females and males to mate, they collected DNA from all the adult bitterlings as well as their offspring. The data showed that females were more likely to choose males whose MHC gene was dissimilar to theirs. The offspring that came from a pair who had dissimilar MHC genes had higher survival rates. Although these researchers did not test this theory, they speculated that perhaps during the male's courtship, he dissipates odor cues from the MHC gene that assist the female in her decision-making process

=== Mice ===
DDK is a lethal phenotype in Mus Domesticus (house mice) that leads to developmental abnormalities and eventually deterioration of the embryo when females with the phenotype mate with males who carry other inbred strains. Scientists have discovered that expression of this incompatibility within the embryo depends on the paternal allele of the DDK syndrome. If the paternal allele is compatible, meaning the male is not carrying an inbred strain (ex. DDK female x non-DDK male), the embryo will survive. However if the male carries the incompatible allele, the embryo will not survive.

== Sympatric color morphs ==
Genetic color polymorphisms are genetically defined color forms between animals of the same species. For the most part, color morphs within a population can interbreed without any issues. However, evidence shows that in certain cases, the viability of interbred color morph offspring is drastically lower than those that present the same color. While coloration is the most pronounced exhibition of a certain phenotype as individuals can be easily and quickly differentiated to the human eye, there are other factors that may be affected but not as easily identified.

=== Gouldian finches ===
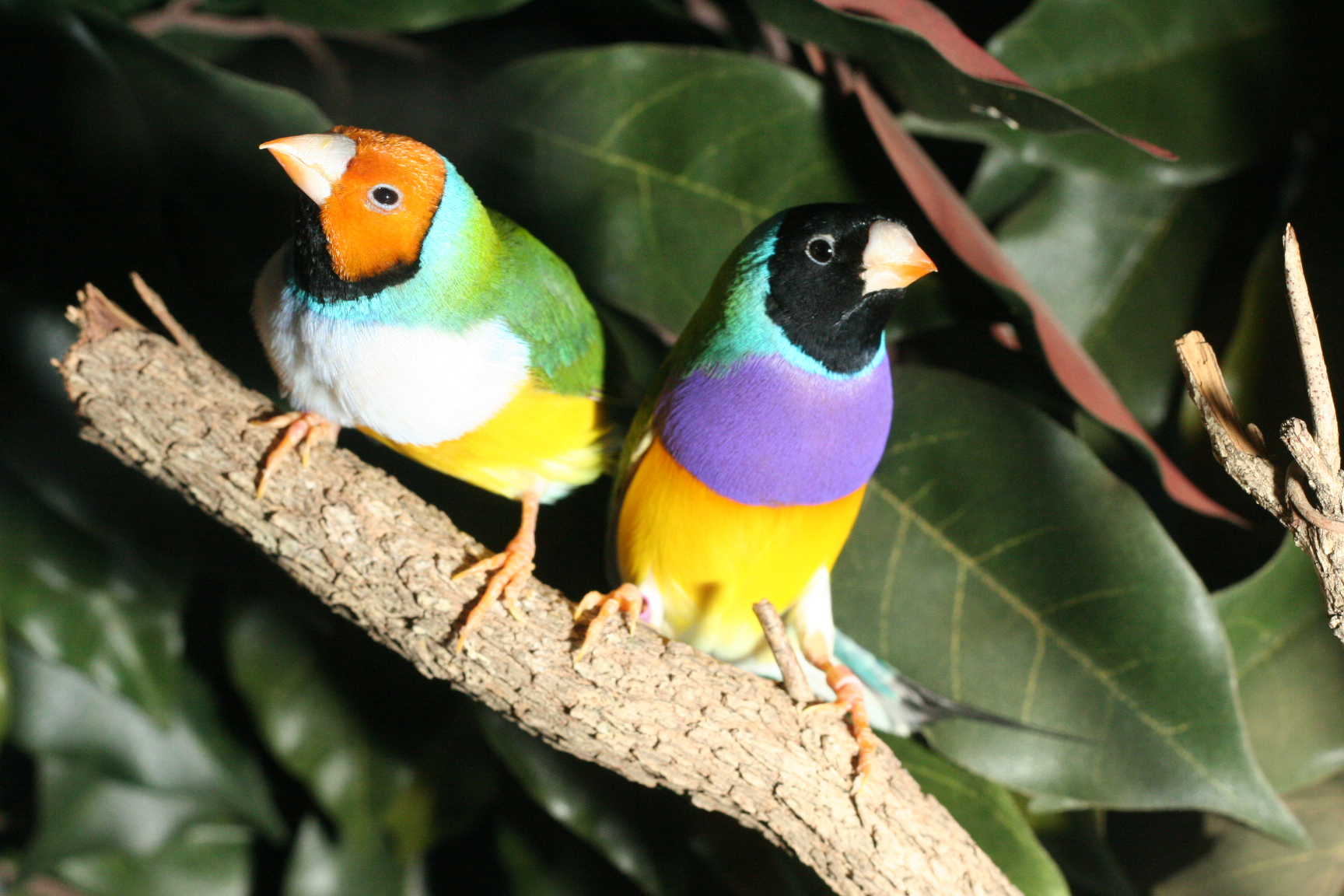
Erythrura Gouldiae

A group of researchers investigated how the survival rates of offspring of Erythrura Gouldiae (Gouldian finch) are impacted when the mating pair have genes for different colors. They bred both pure and mixed pairs of the finches (in this species the gene for producing a red-headed finch is dominant to the one that produces a black headed finch). After incubation, eggs that were produced from mixed pairs were 34.3% less likely to hatch compared to those that were produced from pure pairs. The mixed-pair offspring that did survive the incubation stage were still at a disadvantage, being burdened with a 32.1% increase in mortality between the time that they hatched and 60 days after (during which time they were still in the care of parents). Even after becoming independent, the offspring mortality of mixed pairs was still higher. Specifically the rate of mortality of daughters from mixed-genotypes was much higher.

== Female polyandry and genetic incompatibility ==
Polyandry is a mating pattern that is identified in species when a female mates with two or more males during a period of sexual receptivity. Females may engage in this behavior in the event that their singular mate is a genetically incompatible match. If that were to be the case, she would lose the chance to become pregnant during that season and not be able to try again until the next mating window.

Creating offspring requires the female to allocate a large portion of her resources to both the formation of the embryo. Partaking in polyandry allows her to ensure that the offspring that she will be providing for is going to be viable, and not be a waste of her time, energy, and resources.

Another experiment was done with Gouldian finches, during which researchers wanted to determine the effect of compatibility and incompatibility on the relationship between socially monogamous pairs of finches. They discovered that by participating in "extra-pair" mating relationships, the females were able to more accurately target compatible genes, thus increasing the amount of viable offspring that they produce. Researchers paired females with both compatible and incompatible males as their social partner. However, they also made available both compatible and incompatible males as the extra-pair partner. The data collected revealed that 77.5% of the females mated outside of their pairs. If their extra-pair was compatible (unlike their social partner), the female experienced a 38.9% increase in offspring survival. Although females are unable to tell the difference between compatible and incompatible partners, by participating in polyandry, their likelihood of yielding more and healthier offspring is increased.

== Selfish genetic elements ==
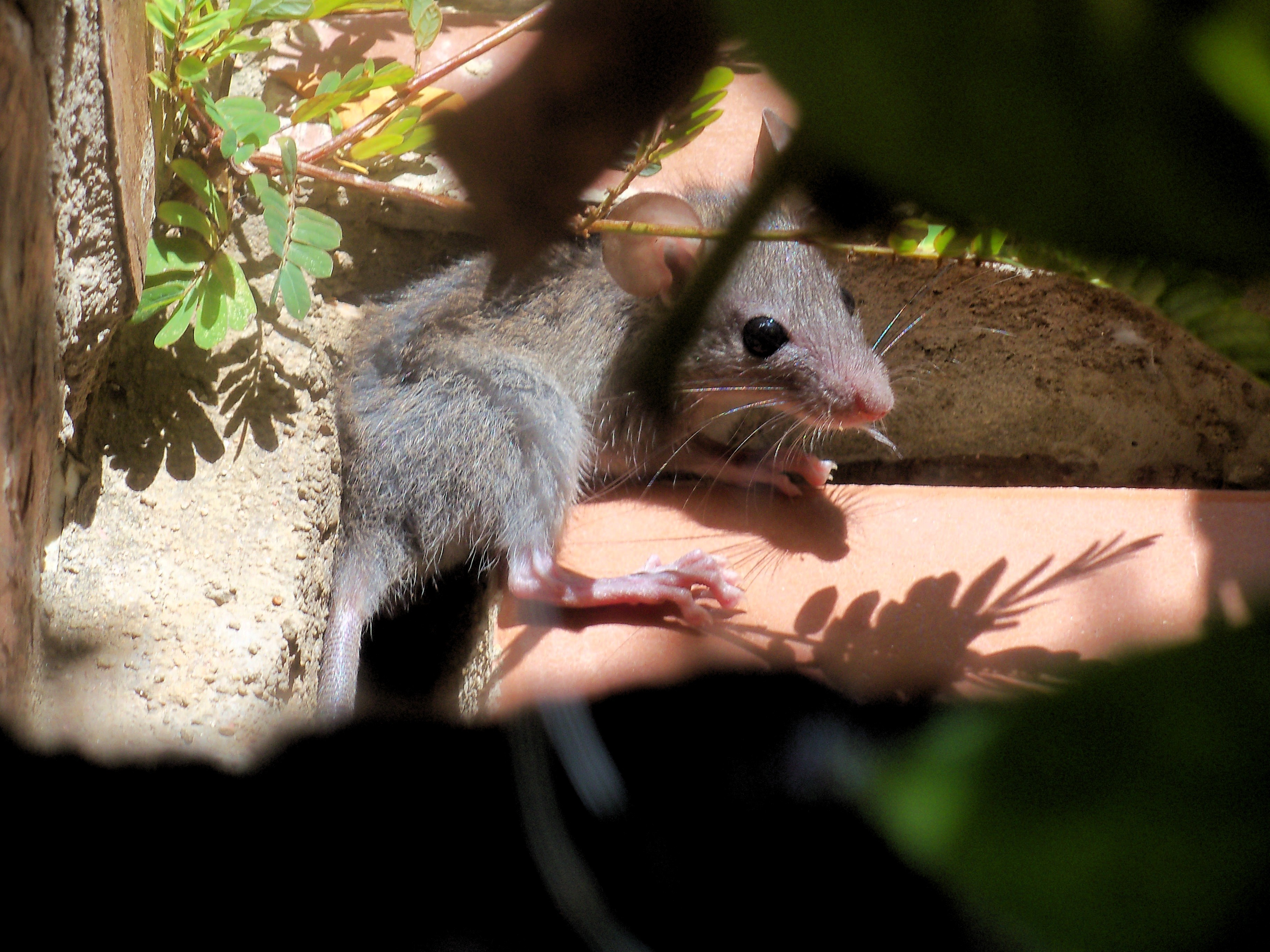
Mus Domesticus

Selfish genetic elements are genes that will use various methods to ensure that they are transferred on to new generations. Selfish elements have the potential to create genetic incompatibilities because their effects frequently depend on interactions with the host genotype and according to whether selfish elements are present in both parents. There has been some debate over whether these selfish genetic elements can actually influence the post-copulatory sperm selection that some females go through in order to determine the best (most compatible) match for her genes.

Mice, carry a particular type of selfish genetic element known as a segregation distorter. This specific classification is able to establish themselves in over 50% of offspring after the meiosis period. Specific to mice, the distorter that they can carry is known as the t-complex. This specific allele is recessive lethal, meaning that it can have a serious effect on the fitness of offspring as well and is most likely deadly. After multiple experiments, it was found that both males and females will avoid mating with those of the opposite sex who are heterozygous for the allele but showed a strong preference for those that were not carriers of the allele. If they were to mate with a heterozygous partner, it could potentially lead to half of their offspring dying as a result of the lethal allele

== Engineered genetic incompatibility ==
Engineered Genetic Incompatibility (EGI) is a technique that is being developed to manufacture incompatibility between species in order to aid in population suppression. Mimicking the Sterile Insect Technique, by introducing EGI males into a population, a sex-sorting incompatible male system is generated. Males that have been genetically modified are able to compete for the attention of females at the same level as those that have not been modified. Because the EGI males are equal rivals to their wild counterparts, they are able to use the female's time and energy reproducing but only to create non-viable offspring.

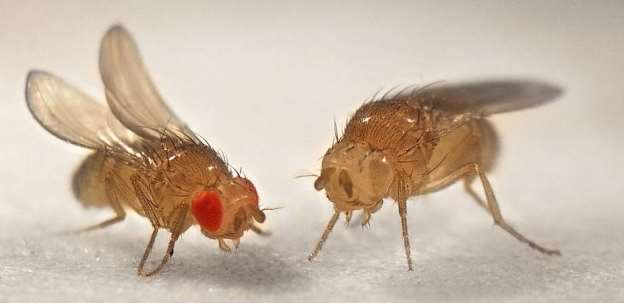
Drosophila Melanogaster

A team of researchers from the University of Minnesota were successful in genetically engineering a population of fruit flies that would not be able to generate viable progeny when mating with wild-types specifically. The researchers manufactured flies that would express a dCas9-based programmable transcription activator or PTA. By this method, the promoter of any gene could be affected. When the EGI flies mate with each other, they are able to avoid the negative effects the PTA generates because they were also given the gene for a mutation that could combat the overexpression of the gene. Their offspring would go on to carry the same incompatibilities to the next generation, furthering the impact on the population. However, the offspring that are produced by hybrid pairs (one EGI and one wild type) have a heterozygous pair of both the PTA and resistance genes and do not survive long after hatching, if they ever do as a result of the PTA's disabling effect on the gene promoter.

=== Mosquitoes ===
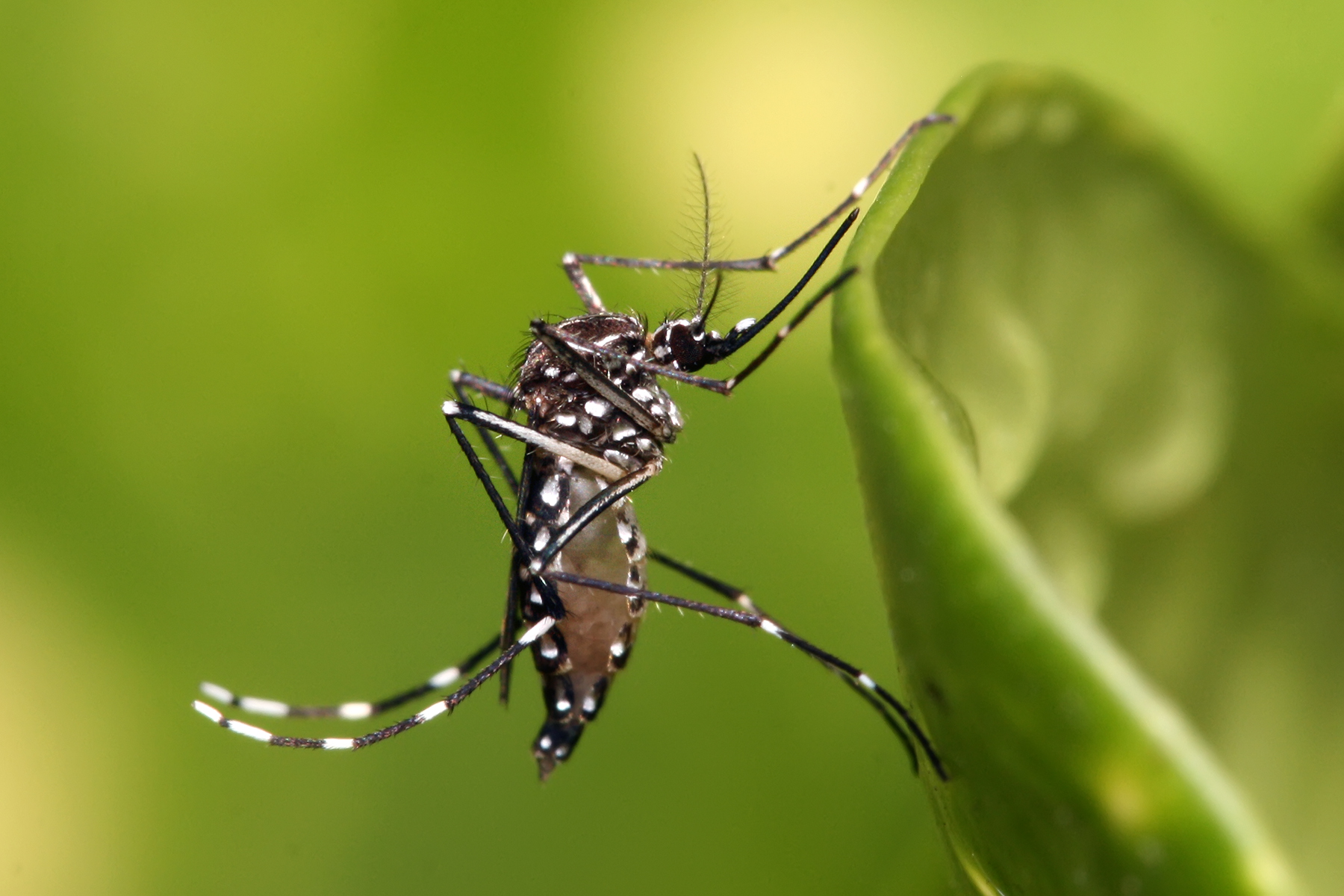
Aedes aegypti

A great deal of research has gone into trying to use this technology as a tool in order to try and control the spread of diseases that are carried by mosquitoes such as Dengue, Zika, and Chikungunya. Because of the successful research done on fruit flies, a team of researchers was able to manipulate some aspects of the experiment and effectively control a simulated population of Aedes aegypti (mosquitoes). For their experiment, they used female lethality meaning that the engineered female mosquitoes will not survive the initial stages of their lives. The researchers titled this new approach the Self-Sorting Incompatible Male System (SSIMS). They observed an increase in population suppression as they increased the number of SSIMS mosquitoes released because the offspring conceived from the SSIMS males were inviable. After this success, a new strategy was modeled, Field-Amplified Male Sterility System (FAMSS). This led to an even bigger impact on population control as the offspring were viable but sterile.
